

178001–178100 

|-bgcolor=#d6d6d6
| 178001 ||  || — || August 29, 2006 || Catalina || CSS || EMA || align=right | 5.0 km || 
|-id=002 bgcolor=#d6d6d6
| 178002 ||  || — || August 29, 2006 || Catalina || CSS || INA || align=right | 5.4 km || 
|-id=003 bgcolor=#E9E9E9
| 178003 ||  || — || August 16, 2006 || Palomar || NEAT || — || align=right | 2.2 km || 
|-id=004 bgcolor=#E9E9E9
| 178004 ||  || — || August 16, 2006 || Siding Spring || SSS || — || align=right | 3.9 km || 
|-id=005 bgcolor=#d6d6d6
| 178005 ||  || — || August 17, 2006 || Palomar || NEAT || — || align=right | 4.2 km || 
|-id=006 bgcolor=#fefefe
| 178006 ||  || — || August 27, 2006 || Anderson Mesa || LONEOS || — || align=right | 2.1 km || 
|-id=007 bgcolor=#E9E9E9
| 178007 ||  || — || August 16, 2006 || Palomar || NEAT || GEF || align=right | 1.6 km || 
|-id=008 bgcolor=#d6d6d6
| 178008 Picard ||  ||  || August 30, 2006 || Saint-Sulpice || B. Christophe || — || align=right | 3.7 km || 
|-id=009 bgcolor=#fefefe
| 178009 ||  || — || August 18, 2006 || Kitt Peak || Spacewatch || — || align=right | 1.4 km || 
|-id=010 bgcolor=#E9E9E9
| 178010 ||  || — || August 18, 2006 || Kitt Peak || Spacewatch || — || align=right | 2.8 km || 
|-id=011 bgcolor=#E9E9E9
| 178011 ||  || — || August 20, 2006 || Kitt Peak || Spacewatch || — || align=right | 1.8 km || 
|-id=012 bgcolor=#E9E9E9
| 178012 ||  || — || August 29, 2006 || Catalina || CSS || — || align=right | 3.7 km || 
|-id=013 bgcolor=#fefefe
| 178013 ||  || — || August 29, 2006 || Anderson Mesa || LONEOS || V || align=right data-sort-value="0.85" | 850 m || 
|-id=014 bgcolor=#d6d6d6
| 178014 Meslay || 2006 RG ||  || September 1, 2006 || Ottmarsheim || C. Rinner || EOS || align=right | 4.2 km || 
|-id=015 bgcolor=#fefefe
| 178015 ||  || — || September 12, 2006 || Catalina || CSS || — || align=right | 1.0 km || 
|-id=016 bgcolor=#E9E9E9
| 178016 ||  || — || September 14, 2006 || Catalina || CSS || — || align=right | 3.6 km || 
|-id=017 bgcolor=#fefefe
| 178017 ||  || — || September 12, 2006 || Catalina || CSS || V || align=right data-sort-value="0.97" | 970 m || 
|-id=018 bgcolor=#fefefe
| 178018 ||  || — || September 12, 2006 || Catalina || CSS || — || align=right data-sort-value="0.94" | 940 m || 
|-id=019 bgcolor=#fefefe
| 178019 ||  || — || September 12, 2006 || Catalina || CSS || MAS || align=right | 1.2 km || 
|-id=020 bgcolor=#fefefe
| 178020 ||  || — || September 14, 2006 || Palomar || NEAT || — || align=right | 1.3 km || 
|-id=021 bgcolor=#E9E9E9
| 178021 ||  || — || September 15, 2006 || Kitt Peak || Spacewatch || — || align=right | 3.0 km || 
|-id=022 bgcolor=#fefefe
| 178022 ||  || — || September 15, 2006 || Palomar || NEAT || — || align=right | 1.6 km || 
|-id=023 bgcolor=#fefefe
| 178023 ||  || — || September 14, 2006 || Catalina || CSS || FLO || align=right data-sort-value="0.85" | 850 m || 
|-id=024 bgcolor=#E9E9E9
| 178024 ||  || — || September 15, 2006 || Kitt Peak || Spacewatch || — || align=right | 3.3 km || 
|-id=025 bgcolor=#E9E9E9
| 178025 ||  || — || September 15, 2006 || Kitt Peak || Spacewatch || — || align=right | 2.8 km || 
|-id=026 bgcolor=#E9E9E9
| 178026 ||  || — || September 13, 2006 || Palomar || NEAT || HOF || align=right | 4.2 km || 
|-id=027 bgcolor=#fefefe
| 178027 ||  || — || September 14, 2006 || Catalina || CSS || — || align=right | 1.6 km || 
|-id=028 bgcolor=#fefefe
| 178028 ||  || — || September 14, 2006 || Kitt Peak || Spacewatch || — || align=right data-sort-value="0.89" | 890 m || 
|-id=029 bgcolor=#fefefe
| 178029 ||  || — || September 14, 2006 || Catalina || CSS || FLO || align=right | 1.0 km || 
|-id=030 bgcolor=#E9E9E9
| 178030 ||  || — || September 14, 2006 || Kitt Peak || Spacewatch || — || align=right | 1.3 km || 
|-id=031 bgcolor=#E9E9E9
| 178031 ||  || — || September 14, 2006 || Kitt Peak || Spacewatch || — || align=right | 2.8 km || 
|-id=032 bgcolor=#d6d6d6
| 178032 ||  || — || September 14, 2006 || Kitt Peak || Spacewatch || — || align=right | 3.7 km || 
|-id=033 bgcolor=#d6d6d6
| 178033 ||  || — || September 14, 2006 || Kitt Peak || Spacewatch || THM || align=right | 3.1 km || 
|-id=034 bgcolor=#E9E9E9
| 178034 ||  || — || September 15, 2006 || Kitt Peak || Spacewatch || — || align=right | 1.4 km || 
|-id=035 bgcolor=#E9E9E9
| 178035 ||  || — || September 15, 2006 || Kitt Peak || Spacewatch || — || align=right | 4.0 km || 
|-id=036 bgcolor=#fefefe
| 178036 ||  || — || September 15, 2006 || Catalina || CSS || V || align=right | 1.3 km || 
|-id=037 bgcolor=#fefefe
| 178037 ||  || — || September 14, 2006 || Kitt Peak || Spacewatch || — || align=right | 1.1 km || 
|-id=038 bgcolor=#fefefe
| 178038 ||  || — || September 14, 2006 || Palomar || NEAT || — || align=right | 1.3 km || 
|-id=039 bgcolor=#E9E9E9
| 178039 ||  || — || September 15, 2006 || Kitt Peak || Spacewatch || — || align=right | 1.7 km || 
|-id=040 bgcolor=#fefefe
| 178040 ||  || — || September 15, 2006 || Kitt Peak || Spacewatch || — || align=right | 1.1 km || 
|-id=041 bgcolor=#fefefe
| 178041 ||  || — || September 15, 2006 || Kitt Peak || Spacewatch || V || align=right data-sort-value="0.80" | 800 m || 
|-id=042 bgcolor=#E9E9E9
| 178042 ||  || — || September 15, 2006 || Kitt Peak || Spacewatch || HOF || align=right | 3.1 km || 
|-id=043 bgcolor=#fefefe
| 178043 ||  || — || September 15, 2006 || Kitt Peak || Spacewatch || — || align=right | 1.5 km || 
|-id=044 bgcolor=#E9E9E9
| 178044 ||  || — || September 15, 2006 || Kitt Peak || Spacewatch || — || align=right | 1.8 km || 
|-id=045 bgcolor=#fefefe
| 178045 ||  || — || September 15, 2006 || Kitt Peak || Spacewatch || — || align=right | 1.2 km || 
|-id=046 bgcolor=#E9E9E9
| 178046 ||  || — || September 15, 2006 || Kitt Peak || Spacewatch || PAD || align=right | 2.6 km || 
|-id=047 bgcolor=#E9E9E9
| 178047 ||  || — || September 15, 2006 || Kitt Peak || Spacewatch || — || align=right | 3.2 km || 
|-id=048 bgcolor=#fefefe
| 178048 ||  || — || September 15, 2006 || Kitt Peak || Spacewatch || NYS || align=right | 1.3 km || 
|-id=049 bgcolor=#E9E9E9
| 178049 ||  || — || September 14, 2006 || Kitt Peak || Spacewatch || — || align=right | 3.0 km || 
|-id=050 bgcolor=#fefefe
| 178050 ||  || — || September 15, 2006 || Kitt Peak || Spacewatch || — || align=right data-sort-value="0.92" | 920 m || 
|-id=051 bgcolor=#E9E9E9
| 178051 ||  || — || September 16, 2006 || Palomar || NEAT || WIT || align=right | 1.5 km || 
|-id=052 bgcolor=#E9E9E9
| 178052 ||  || — || September 16, 2006 || Socorro || LINEAR || MRX || align=right | 1.9 km || 
|-id=053 bgcolor=#fefefe
| 178053 ||  || — || September 16, 2006 || Catalina || CSS || — || align=right | 1.4 km || 
|-id=054 bgcolor=#E9E9E9
| 178054 ||  || — || September 17, 2006 || Catalina || CSS || HNA || align=right | 3.1 km || 
|-id=055 bgcolor=#fefefe
| 178055 ||  || — || September 17, 2006 || Kitt Peak || Spacewatch || ERI || align=right | 1.8 km || 
|-id=056 bgcolor=#E9E9E9
| 178056 ||  || — || September 18, 2006 || Anderson Mesa || LONEOS || — || align=right | 2.2 km || 
|-id=057 bgcolor=#d6d6d6
| 178057 ||  || — || September 16, 2006 || Catalina || CSS || — || align=right | 2.7 km || 
|-id=058 bgcolor=#fefefe
| 178058 ||  || — || September 17, 2006 || Kitt Peak || Spacewatch || — || align=right | 1.0 km || 
|-id=059 bgcolor=#E9E9E9
| 178059 ||  || — || September 17, 2006 || Kitt Peak || Spacewatch || NEM || align=right | 4.0 km || 
|-id=060 bgcolor=#fefefe
| 178060 ||  || — || September 17, 2006 || Anderson Mesa || LONEOS || — || align=right | 1.3 km || 
|-id=061 bgcolor=#fefefe
| 178061 ||  || — || September 17, 2006 || Anderson Mesa || LONEOS || V || align=right | 1.2 km || 
|-id=062 bgcolor=#fefefe
| 178062 ||  || — || September 18, 2006 || Kitt Peak || Spacewatch || V || align=right data-sort-value="0.90" | 900 m || 
|-id=063 bgcolor=#d6d6d6
| 178063 ||  || — || September 18, 2006 || Anderson Mesa || LONEOS || — || align=right | 4.5 km || 
|-id=064 bgcolor=#d6d6d6
| 178064 ||  || — || September 18, 2006 || Catalina || CSS || — || align=right | 3.8 km || 
|-id=065 bgcolor=#E9E9E9
| 178065 ||  || — || September 20, 2006 || Palomar || NEAT || — || align=right | 2.6 km || 
|-id=066 bgcolor=#E9E9E9
| 178066 ||  || — || September 22, 2006 || RAS || A. Lowe || RAF || align=right | 2.1 km || 
|-id=067 bgcolor=#d6d6d6
| 178067 ||  || — || September 19, 2006 || Kitt Peak || Spacewatch || — || align=right | 4.1 km || 
|-id=068 bgcolor=#E9E9E9
| 178068 ||  || — || September 20, 2006 || Socorro || LINEAR || NEM || align=right | 3.5 km || 
|-id=069 bgcolor=#fefefe
| 178069 ||  || — || September 18, 2006 || Kitt Peak || Spacewatch || NYS || align=right data-sort-value="0.87" | 870 m || 
|-id=070 bgcolor=#E9E9E9
| 178070 ||  || — || September 18, 2006 || Kitt Peak || Spacewatch || — || align=right | 1.9 km || 
|-id=071 bgcolor=#E9E9E9
| 178071 ||  || — || September 18, 2006 || Kitt Peak || Spacewatch || — || align=right | 1.8 km || 
|-id=072 bgcolor=#E9E9E9
| 178072 ||  || — || September 18, 2006 || Kitt Peak || Spacewatch || — || align=right | 1.3 km || 
|-id=073 bgcolor=#E9E9E9
| 178073 ||  || — || September 18, 2006 || Kitt Peak || Spacewatch || HOF || align=right | 3.1 km || 
|-id=074 bgcolor=#E9E9E9
| 178074 ||  || — || September 19, 2006 || Kitt Peak || Spacewatch || — || align=right | 1.6 km || 
|-id=075 bgcolor=#E9E9E9
| 178075 ||  || — || September 22, 2006 || Catalina || CSS || — || align=right | 4.8 km || 
|-id=076 bgcolor=#d6d6d6
| 178076 ||  || — || September 24, 2006 || Kitt Peak || Spacewatch || — || align=right | 3.9 km || 
|-id=077 bgcolor=#d6d6d6
| 178077 ||  || — || September 24, 2006 || Anderson Mesa || LONEOS || — || align=right | 4.0 km || 
|-id=078 bgcolor=#E9E9E9
| 178078 ||  || — || September 25, 2006 || RAS || A. Lowe || — || align=right | 2.5 km || 
|-id=079 bgcolor=#d6d6d6
| 178079 ||  || — || September 25, 2006 || Desert Moon || B. L. Stevens || — || align=right | 4.3 km || 
|-id=080 bgcolor=#fefefe
| 178080 ||  || — || September 19, 2006 || Kitt Peak || Spacewatch || NYS || align=right data-sort-value="0.91" | 910 m || 
|-id=081 bgcolor=#fefefe
| 178081 ||  || — || September 23, 2006 || Kitt Peak || Spacewatch || — || align=right | 1.1 km || 
|-id=082 bgcolor=#d6d6d6
| 178082 ||  || — || September 23, 2006 || Kitt Peak || Spacewatch || HYG || align=right | 3.7 km || 
|-id=083 bgcolor=#d6d6d6
| 178083 ||  || — || September 25, 2006 || Kitt Peak || Spacewatch || LIX || align=right | 4.1 km || 
|-id=084 bgcolor=#fefefe
| 178084 ||  || — || September 25, 2006 || Kitt Peak || Spacewatch || NYS || align=right data-sort-value="0.92" | 920 m || 
|-id=085 bgcolor=#d6d6d6
| 178085 ||  || — || September 25, 2006 || Mount Lemmon || Mount Lemmon Survey || THM || align=right | 2.5 km || 
|-id=086 bgcolor=#E9E9E9
| 178086 ||  || — || September 26, 2006 || Mount Lemmon || Mount Lemmon Survey || — || align=right | 2.1 km || 
|-id=087 bgcolor=#E9E9E9
| 178087 ||  || — || September 26, 2006 || Catalina || CSS || EUN || align=right | 1.7 km || 
|-id=088 bgcolor=#E9E9E9
| 178088 ||  || — || September 27, 2006 || Jarnac || Jarnac Obs. || — || align=right | 3.2 km || 
|-id=089 bgcolor=#fefefe
| 178089 ||  || — || September 24, 2006 || Kitt Peak || Spacewatch || V || align=right | 1.0 km || 
|-id=090 bgcolor=#E9E9E9
| 178090 ||  || — || September 26, 2006 || Kitt Peak || Spacewatch || WIT || align=right | 1.7 km || 
|-id=091 bgcolor=#E9E9E9
| 178091 ||  || — || September 26, 2006 || Catalina || CSS || — || align=right | 4.1 km || 
|-id=092 bgcolor=#d6d6d6
| 178092 ||  || — || September 26, 2006 || Catalina || CSS || — || align=right | 5.3 km || 
|-id=093 bgcolor=#E9E9E9
| 178093 ||  || — || September 27, 2006 || Kitt Peak || Spacewatch || — || align=right | 3.3 km || 
|-id=094 bgcolor=#d6d6d6
| 178094 ||  || — || September 29, 2006 || Kitami || K. Endate || TEL || align=right | 2.0 km || 
|-id=095 bgcolor=#fefefe
| 178095 ||  || — || September 25, 2006 || Mount Lemmon || Mount Lemmon Survey || — || align=right data-sort-value="0.81" | 810 m || 
|-id=096 bgcolor=#d6d6d6
| 178096 ||  || — || September 26, 2006 || Kitt Peak || Spacewatch || — || align=right | 3.6 km || 
|-id=097 bgcolor=#E9E9E9
| 178097 ||  || — || September 26, 2006 || Socorro || LINEAR || — || align=right | 3.1 km || 
|-id=098 bgcolor=#E9E9E9
| 178098 ||  || — || September 26, 2006 || Kitt Peak || Spacewatch || — || align=right | 1.4 km || 
|-id=099 bgcolor=#d6d6d6
| 178099 ||  || — || September 26, 2006 || Socorro || LINEAR || EOS || align=right | 3.0 km || 
|-id=100 bgcolor=#E9E9E9
| 178100 ||  || — || September 26, 2006 || Kitt Peak || Spacewatch || — || align=right | 1.7 km || 
|}

178101–178200 

|-bgcolor=#E9E9E9
| 178101 ||  || — || September 26, 2006 || Kitt Peak || Spacewatch || AGN || align=right | 1.6 km || 
|-id=102 bgcolor=#fefefe
| 178102 ||  || — || September 28, 2006 || Mount Lemmon || Mount Lemmon Survey || V || align=right data-sort-value="0.67" | 670 m || 
|-id=103 bgcolor=#d6d6d6
| 178103 ||  || — || September 29, 2006 || Anderson Mesa || LONEOS || HYG || align=right | 4.0 km || 
|-id=104 bgcolor=#d6d6d6
| 178104 ||  || — || September 30, 2006 || Siding Spring || SSS || Tj (2.9) || align=right | 5.1 km || 
|-id=105 bgcolor=#E9E9E9
| 178105 ||  || — || September 26, 2006 || Catalina || CSS || GEF || align=right | 1.7 km || 
|-id=106 bgcolor=#E9E9E9
| 178106 ||  || — || September 19, 2006 || Catalina || CSS || — || align=right | 2.0 km || 
|-id=107 bgcolor=#fefefe
| 178107 ||  || — || September 26, 2006 || Catalina || CSS || — || align=right | 1.1 km || 
|-id=108 bgcolor=#fefefe
| 178108 ||  || — || September 27, 2006 || Kitt Peak || Spacewatch || V || align=right data-sort-value="0.97" | 970 m || 
|-id=109 bgcolor=#E9E9E9
| 178109 ||  || — || September 27, 2006 || Kitt Peak || Spacewatch || — || align=right | 1.4 km || 
|-id=110 bgcolor=#fefefe
| 178110 ||  || — || September 27, 2006 || Kitt Peak || Spacewatch || — || align=right | 1.2 km || 
|-id=111 bgcolor=#fefefe
| 178111 ||  || — || September 27, 2006 || Kitt Peak || Spacewatch || — || align=right | 1.0 km || 
|-id=112 bgcolor=#fefefe
| 178112 ||  || — || September 20, 2006 || Anderson Mesa || LONEOS || V || align=right | 1.1 km || 
|-id=113 bgcolor=#d6d6d6
| 178113 Benjamindilday ||  ||  || September 27, 2006 || Apache Point || A. C. Becker || — || align=right | 4.3 km || 
|-id=114 bgcolor=#d6d6d6
| 178114 ||  || — || September 17, 2006 || Catalina || CSS || EOS || align=right | 2.9 km || 
|-id=115 bgcolor=#d6d6d6
| 178115 ||  || — || September 27, 2006 || Catalina || CSS || — || align=right | 5.9 km || 
|-id=116 bgcolor=#d6d6d6
| 178116 ||  || — || October 10, 2006 || Gnosca || S. Sposetti || — || align=right | 3.0 km || 
|-id=117 bgcolor=#E9E9E9
| 178117 ||  || — || October 4, 2006 || Mount Lemmon || Mount Lemmon Survey || HEN || align=right | 1.6 km || 
|-id=118 bgcolor=#fefefe
| 178118 ||  || — || October 3, 2006 || Kitt Peak || Spacewatch || NYS || align=right data-sort-value="0.96" | 960 m || 
|-id=119 bgcolor=#d6d6d6
| 178119 ||  || — || October 11, 2006 || Kitt Peak || Spacewatch || EOS || align=right | 3.0 km || 
|-id=120 bgcolor=#E9E9E9
| 178120 ||  || — || October 12, 2006 || Palomar || NEAT || MAR || align=right | 1.5 km || 
|-id=121 bgcolor=#d6d6d6
| 178121 ||  || — || October 12, 2006 || Kitt Peak || Spacewatch || — || align=right | 3.7 km || 
|-id=122 bgcolor=#d6d6d6
| 178122 ||  || — || October 12, 2006 || Kitt Peak || Spacewatch || KOR || align=right | 1.5 km || 
|-id=123 bgcolor=#d6d6d6
| 178123 ||  || — || October 12, 2006 || Kitt Peak || Spacewatch || KOR || align=right | 1.5 km || 
|-id=124 bgcolor=#d6d6d6
| 178124 ||  || — || October 12, 2006 || Kitt Peak || Spacewatch || — || align=right | 3.3 km || 
|-id=125 bgcolor=#E9E9E9
| 178125 ||  || — || October 12, 2006 || Kitt Peak || Spacewatch || — || align=right | 1.8 km || 
|-id=126 bgcolor=#E9E9E9
| 178126 ||  || — || October 12, 2006 || Kitt Peak || Spacewatch || — || align=right | 1.6 km || 
|-id=127 bgcolor=#E9E9E9
| 178127 ||  || — || October 12, 2006 || Kitt Peak || Spacewatch || HOF || align=right | 3.6 km || 
|-id=128 bgcolor=#d6d6d6
| 178128 ||  || — || October 12, 2006 || Kitt Peak || Spacewatch || THM || align=right | 2.8 km || 
|-id=129 bgcolor=#d6d6d6
| 178129 ||  || — || October 12, 2006 || Kitt Peak || Spacewatch || — || align=right | 4.8 km || 
|-id=130 bgcolor=#E9E9E9
| 178130 ||  || — || October 12, 2006 || Kitt Peak || Spacewatch || — || align=right | 4.8 km || 
|-id=131 bgcolor=#fefefe
| 178131 ||  || — || October 12, 2006 || Kitt Peak || Spacewatch || — || align=right | 1.3 km || 
|-id=132 bgcolor=#d6d6d6
| 178132 ||  || — || October 12, 2006 || Palomar || NEAT || — || align=right | 4.1 km || 
|-id=133 bgcolor=#E9E9E9
| 178133 ||  || — || October 12, 2006 || Palomar || NEAT || AGN || align=right | 3.3 km || 
|-id=134 bgcolor=#E9E9E9
| 178134 ||  || — || October 12, 2006 || Kitt Peak || Spacewatch || — || align=right | 3.6 km || 
|-id=135 bgcolor=#E9E9E9
| 178135 ||  || — || October 12, 2006 || Kitt Peak || Spacewatch || — || align=right | 3.4 km || 
|-id=136 bgcolor=#E9E9E9
| 178136 ||  || — || October 12, 2006 || Palomar || NEAT || — || align=right | 2.9 km || 
|-id=137 bgcolor=#fefefe
| 178137 ||  || — || October 12, 2006 || Palomar || NEAT || — || align=right | 2.8 km || 
|-id=138 bgcolor=#E9E9E9
| 178138 ||  || — || October 9, 2006 || Palomar || NEAT || EUN || align=right | 1.8 km || 
|-id=139 bgcolor=#fefefe
| 178139 ||  || — || October 10, 2006 || Palomar || NEAT || V || align=right data-sort-value="0.98" | 980 m || 
|-id=140 bgcolor=#d6d6d6
| 178140 ||  || — || October 11, 2006 || Palomar || NEAT || — || align=right | 5.9 km || 
|-id=141 bgcolor=#E9E9E9
| 178141 ||  || — || October 11, 2006 || Palomar || NEAT || — || align=right | 1.4 km || 
|-id=142 bgcolor=#d6d6d6
| 178142 ||  || — || October 11, 2006 || Palomar || NEAT || — || align=right | 4.4 km || 
|-id=143 bgcolor=#d6d6d6
| 178143 ||  || — || October 11, 2006 || Palomar || NEAT || — || align=right | 4.5 km || 
|-id=144 bgcolor=#E9E9E9
| 178144 ||  || — || October 11, 2006 || Palomar || NEAT || HOF || align=right | 3.8 km || 
|-id=145 bgcolor=#fefefe
| 178145 ||  || — || October 13, 2006 || Kitt Peak || Spacewatch || — || align=right | 1.1 km || 
|-id=146 bgcolor=#E9E9E9
| 178146 ||  || — || October 13, 2006 || Kitt Peak || Spacewatch || — || align=right | 2.2 km || 
|-id=147 bgcolor=#d6d6d6
| 178147 ||  || — || October 13, 2006 || Kitt Peak || Spacewatch || — || align=right | 5.4 km || 
|-id=148 bgcolor=#E9E9E9
| 178148 ||  || — || October 13, 2006 || Kitt Peak || Spacewatch || — || align=right | 1.8 km || 
|-id=149 bgcolor=#d6d6d6
| 178149 ||  || — || October 13, 2006 || Kitt Peak || Spacewatch || — || align=right | 3.6 km || 
|-id=150 bgcolor=#E9E9E9
| 178150 Taiyuinkwei ||  ||  || October 14, 2006 || Lulin Observatory || C.-S. Lin, Q.-z. Ye || — || align=right | 2.1 km || 
|-id=151 bgcolor=#d6d6d6
| 178151 Kulangsu ||  ||  || October 14, 2006 || Lulin Observatory || Q.-z. Ye, C.-S. Lin || — || align=right | 4.6 km || 
|-id=152 bgcolor=#d6d6d6
| 178152 ||  || — || October 12, 2006 || Palomar || NEAT || EMA || align=right | 3.8 km || 
|-id=153 bgcolor=#fefefe
| 178153 ||  || — || October 13, 2006 || Kitt Peak || Spacewatch || — || align=right | 1.4 km || 
|-id=154 bgcolor=#d6d6d6
| 178154 ||  || — || October 4, 2006 || Mount Lemmon || Mount Lemmon Survey || — || align=right | 5.6 km || 
|-id=155 bgcolor=#d6d6d6
| 178155 Kenzaarraki ||  ||  || October 3, 2006 || Apache Point || A. C. Becker || — || align=right | 4.3 km || 
|-id=156 bgcolor=#E9E9E9
| 178156 Borbála ||  ||  || October 17, 2006 || Piszkéstető || K. Sárneczky, Z. Kuli || MAR || align=right | 1.4 km || 
|-id=157 bgcolor=#E9E9E9
| 178157 ||  || — || October 16, 2006 || Kitt Peak || Spacewatch || PAD || align=right | 3.2 km || 
|-id=158 bgcolor=#d6d6d6
| 178158 ||  || — || October 16, 2006 || Catalina || CSS || — || align=right | 4.5 km || 
|-id=159 bgcolor=#E9E9E9
| 178159 ||  || — || October 16, 2006 || Catalina || CSS || MIS || align=right | 3.3 km || 
|-id=160 bgcolor=#E9E9E9
| 178160 ||  || — || October 17, 2006 || Mount Lemmon || Mount Lemmon Survey || — || align=right | 1.3 km || 
|-id=161 bgcolor=#E9E9E9
| 178161 ||  || — || October 17, 2006 || Mount Lemmon || Mount Lemmon Survey || — || align=right | 2.9 km || 
|-id=162 bgcolor=#E9E9E9
| 178162 ||  || — || October 16, 2006 || Catalina || CSS || — || align=right | 1.0 km || 
|-id=163 bgcolor=#E9E9E9
| 178163 ||  || — || October 16, 2006 || Kitt Peak || Spacewatch || NEM || align=right | 3.6 km || 
|-id=164 bgcolor=#d6d6d6
| 178164 ||  || — || October 16, 2006 || Kitt Peak || Spacewatch || — || align=right | 2.8 km || 
|-id=165 bgcolor=#d6d6d6
| 178165 ||  || — || October 16, 2006 || Kitt Peak || Spacewatch || THM || align=right | 4.6 km || 
|-id=166 bgcolor=#E9E9E9
| 178166 ||  || — || October 16, 2006 || Kitt Peak || Spacewatch || HEN || align=right | 1.7 km || 
|-id=167 bgcolor=#d6d6d6
| 178167 ||  || — || October 16, 2006 || Kitt Peak || Spacewatch || KOR || align=right | 1.5 km || 
|-id=168 bgcolor=#d6d6d6
| 178168 ||  || — || October 16, 2006 || Kitt Peak || Spacewatch || THM || align=right | 3.1 km || 
|-id=169 bgcolor=#d6d6d6
| 178169 ||  || — || October 17, 2006 || Mount Lemmon || Mount Lemmon Survey || — || align=right | 4.4 km || 
|-id=170 bgcolor=#E9E9E9
| 178170 ||  || — || October 17, 2006 || Mount Lemmon || Mount Lemmon Survey || — || align=right | 1.9 km || 
|-id=171 bgcolor=#d6d6d6
| 178171 ||  || — || October 23, 2006 || Kitami || K. Endate || TEL || align=right | 2.2 km || 
|-id=172 bgcolor=#d6d6d6
| 178172 ||  || — || October 22, 2006 || Altschwendt || W. Ries || EOS || align=right | 3.5 km || 
|-id=173 bgcolor=#d6d6d6
| 178173 ||  || — || October 16, 2006 || Catalina || CSS || KOR || align=right | 1.9 km || 
|-id=174 bgcolor=#E9E9E9
| 178174 ||  || — || October 17, 2006 || Kitt Peak || Spacewatch || — || align=right | 1.4 km || 
|-id=175 bgcolor=#E9E9E9
| 178175 ||  || — || October 17, 2006 || Kitt Peak || Spacewatch || — || align=right | 1.9 km || 
|-id=176 bgcolor=#E9E9E9
| 178176 ||  || — || October 17, 2006 || Mount Lemmon || Mount Lemmon Survey || — || align=right | 1.7 km || 
|-id=177 bgcolor=#E9E9E9
| 178177 ||  || — || October 17, 2006 || Kitt Peak || Spacewatch || NEM || align=right | 3.0 km || 
|-id=178 bgcolor=#d6d6d6
| 178178 ||  || — || October 18, 2006 || Kitt Peak || Spacewatch || KOR || align=right | 1.9 km || 
|-id=179 bgcolor=#d6d6d6
| 178179 ||  || — || October 18, 2006 || Kitt Peak || Spacewatch || — || align=right | 2.8 km || 
|-id=180 bgcolor=#E9E9E9
| 178180 ||  || — || October 19, 2006 || Kitt Peak || Spacewatch || — || align=right | 1.4 km || 
|-id=181 bgcolor=#E9E9E9
| 178181 ||  || — || October 19, 2006 || Mount Lemmon || Mount Lemmon Survey || — || align=right | 3.3 km || 
|-id=182 bgcolor=#E9E9E9
| 178182 ||  || — || October 20, 2006 || Mount Lemmon || Mount Lemmon Survey || — || align=right | 1.8 km || 
|-id=183 bgcolor=#d6d6d6
| 178183 ||  || — || October 21, 2006 || Mount Lemmon || Mount Lemmon Survey || KOR || align=right | 1.8 km || 
|-id=184 bgcolor=#fefefe
| 178184 ||  || — || October 21, 2006 || Mount Lemmon || Mount Lemmon Survey || — || align=right data-sort-value="0.99" | 990 m || 
|-id=185 bgcolor=#E9E9E9
| 178185 ||  || — || October 21, 2006 || Mount Lemmon || Mount Lemmon Survey || — || align=right | 3.5 km || 
|-id=186 bgcolor=#E9E9E9
| 178186 ||  || — || October 21, 2006 || Mount Lemmon || Mount Lemmon Survey || AGN || align=right | 1.5 km || 
|-id=187 bgcolor=#E9E9E9
| 178187 ||  || — || October 16, 2006 || Catalina || CSS || — || align=right | 3.0 km || 
|-id=188 bgcolor=#E9E9E9
| 178188 ||  || — || October 20, 2006 || Socorro || LINEAR || — || align=right | 3.6 km || 
|-id=189 bgcolor=#d6d6d6
| 178189 ||  || — || October 20, 2006 || Kitt Peak || Spacewatch || KOR || align=right | 1.9 km || 
|-id=190 bgcolor=#fefefe
| 178190 ||  || — || October 20, 2006 || Kitt Peak || Spacewatch || NYS || align=right data-sort-value="0.86" | 860 m || 
|-id=191 bgcolor=#d6d6d6
| 178191 ||  || — || October 22, 2006 || Palomar || NEAT || — || align=right | 5.1 km || 
|-id=192 bgcolor=#E9E9E9
| 178192 ||  || — || October 23, 2006 || Kitt Peak || Spacewatch || — || align=right | 1.9 km || 
|-id=193 bgcolor=#E9E9E9
| 178193 ||  || — || October 20, 2006 || Palomar || NEAT || — || align=right | 2.0 km || 
|-id=194 bgcolor=#fefefe
| 178194 ||  || — || October 20, 2006 || Palomar || NEAT || V || align=right | 1.1 km || 
|-id=195 bgcolor=#E9E9E9
| 178195 ||  || — || October 20, 2006 || Palomar || NEAT || — || align=right | 2.2 km || 
|-id=196 bgcolor=#d6d6d6
| 178196 ||  || — || October 20, 2006 || Palomar || NEAT || — || align=right | 3.7 km || 
|-id=197 bgcolor=#d6d6d6
| 178197 ||  || — || October 21, 2006 || Palomar || NEAT || HYG || align=right | 4.3 km || 
|-id=198 bgcolor=#d6d6d6
| 178198 ||  || — || October 27, 2006 || Mount Lemmon || Mount Lemmon Survey || — || align=right | 5.5 km || 
|-id=199 bgcolor=#E9E9E9
| 178199 ||  || — || October 28, 2006 || Kitt Peak || Spacewatch || HEN || align=right | 1.2 km || 
|-id=200 bgcolor=#d6d6d6
| 178200 ||  || — || October 29, 2006 || Catalina || CSS || — || align=right | 5.5 km || 
|}

178201–178300 

|-bgcolor=#fefefe
| 178201 ||  || — || October 21, 2006 || Kitt Peak || Spacewatch || MAS || align=right | 1.3 km || 
|-id=202 bgcolor=#E9E9E9
| 178202 ||  || — || November 10, 2006 || Kitt Peak || Spacewatch || — || align=right | 2.3 km || 
|-id=203 bgcolor=#E9E9E9
| 178203 ||  || — || November 11, 2006 || Mount Lemmon || Mount Lemmon Survey || — || align=right | 2.8 km || 
|-id=204 bgcolor=#d6d6d6
| 178204 ||  || — || November 10, 2006 || Kitt Peak || Spacewatch || THM || align=right | 2.8 km || 
|-id=205 bgcolor=#d6d6d6
| 178205 ||  || — || November 9, 2006 || Kitt Peak || Spacewatch || — || align=right | 4.3 km || 
|-id=206 bgcolor=#d6d6d6
| 178206 ||  || — || November 10, 2006 || Kitt Peak || Spacewatch || KOR || align=right | 1.9 km || 
|-id=207 bgcolor=#d6d6d6
| 178207 ||  || — || November 11, 2006 || Catalina || CSS || EOS || align=right | 3.8 km || 
|-id=208 bgcolor=#d6d6d6
| 178208 ||  || — || November 12, 2006 || Mount Lemmon || Mount Lemmon Survey || THM || align=right | 4.3 km || 
|-id=209 bgcolor=#d6d6d6
| 178209 ||  || — || November 10, 2006 || Kitt Peak || Spacewatch || — || align=right | 4.3 km || 
|-id=210 bgcolor=#E9E9E9
| 178210 ||  || — || November 11, 2006 || Kitt Peak || Spacewatch || — || align=right | 1.6 km || 
|-id=211 bgcolor=#d6d6d6
| 178211 ||  || — || November 11, 2006 || Kitt Peak || Spacewatch || KOR || align=right | 2.4 km || 
|-id=212 bgcolor=#E9E9E9
| 178212 ||  || — || November 11, 2006 || Kitt Peak || Spacewatch || HEN || align=right | 1.4 km || 
|-id=213 bgcolor=#d6d6d6
| 178213 ||  || — || November 11, 2006 || Kitt Peak || Spacewatch || — || align=right | 3.8 km || 
|-id=214 bgcolor=#d6d6d6
| 178214 ||  || — || November 11, 2006 || Kitt Peak || Spacewatch || — || align=right | 3.7 km || 
|-id=215 bgcolor=#fefefe
| 178215 ||  || — || November 12, 2006 || Mount Lemmon || Mount Lemmon Survey || — || align=right data-sort-value="0.97" | 970 m || 
|-id=216 bgcolor=#d6d6d6
| 178216 ||  || — || November 14, 2006 || Socorro || LINEAR || — || align=right | 6.0 km || 
|-id=217 bgcolor=#fefefe
| 178217 ||  || — || November 15, 2006 || Catalina || CSS || MAS || align=right | 1.3 km || 
|-id=218 bgcolor=#d6d6d6
| 178218 ||  || — || November 11, 2006 || Catalina || CSS || 628 || align=right | 2.6 km || 
|-id=219 bgcolor=#E9E9E9
| 178219 ||  || — || November 13, 2006 || Kitt Peak || Spacewatch || — || align=right | 4.1 km || 
|-id=220 bgcolor=#d6d6d6
| 178220 ||  || — || November 14, 2006 || Mount Lemmon || Mount Lemmon Survey || — || align=right | 4.1 km || 
|-id=221 bgcolor=#d6d6d6
| 178221 ||  || — || November 15, 2006 || Kitt Peak || Spacewatch || KOR || align=right | 1.6 km || 
|-id=222 bgcolor=#d6d6d6
| 178222 ||  || — || November 15, 2006 || Catalina || CSS || — || align=right | 4.6 km || 
|-id=223 bgcolor=#d6d6d6
| 178223 ||  || — || November 15, 2006 || Catalina || CSS || EOS || align=right | 2.9 km || 
|-id=224 bgcolor=#d6d6d6
| 178224 ||  || — || November 8, 2006 || Palomar || NEAT || — || align=right | 4.2 km || 
|-id=225 bgcolor=#E9E9E9
| 178225 ||  || — || November 8, 2006 || Palomar || NEAT || — || align=right | 4.3 km || 
|-id=226 bgcolor=#fefefe
| 178226 Rebeccalouise ||  ||  || November 9, 2006 || Apache Point || SDSS || NYS || align=right | 1.1 km || 
|-id=227 bgcolor=#d6d6d6
| 178227 ||  || — || November 16, 2006 || Calvin-Rehoboth || Calvin–Rehoboth Obs. || — || align=right | 5.9 km || 
|-id=228 bgcolor=#fefefe
| 178228 ||  || — || November 16, 2006 || Kitt Peak || Spacewatch || — || align=right | 1.1 km || 
|-id=229 bgcolor=#d6d6d6
| 178229 ||  || — || November 16, 2006 || Mount Lemmon || Mount Lemmon Survey || KOR || align=right | 2.0 km || 
|-id=230 bgcolor=#E9E9E9
| 178230 ||  || — || November 16, 2006 || Socorro || LINEAR || WIT || align=right | 1.8 km || 
|-id=231 bgcolor=#E9E9E9
| 178231 ||  || — || November 16, 2006 || Mount Lemmon || Mount Lemmon Survey || — || align=right | 2.6 km || 
|-id=232 bgcolor=#d6d6d6
| 178232 ||  || — || November 16, 2006 || Catalina || CSS || — || align=right | 5.3 km || 
|-id=233 bgcolor=#d6d6d6
| 178233 ||  || — || November 17, 2006 || Catalina || CSS || — || align=right | 6.1 km || 
|-id=234 bgcolor=#d6d6d6
| 178234 ||  || — || November 18, 2006 || Kitt Peak || Spacewatch || — || align=right | 4.3 km || 
|-id=235 bgcolor=#fefefe
| 178235 ||  || — || November 19, 2006 || Kitt Peak || Spacewatch || — || align=right | 1.2 km || 
|-id=236 bgcolor=#fefefe
| 178236 ||  || — || November 19, 2006 || Kitt Peak || Spacewatch || MAS || align=right data-sort-value="0.97" | 970 m || 
|-id=237 bgcolor=#d6d6d6
| 178237 ||  || — || November 17, 2006 || Mount Lemmon || Mount Lemmon Survey || — || align=right | 4.7 km || 
|-id=238 bgcolor=#fefefe
| 178238 ||  || — || November 22, 2006 || Catalina || CSS || — || align=right | 1.3 km || 
|-id=239 bgcolor=#E9E9E9
| 178239 ||  || — || November 23, 2006 || Kitt Peak || Spacewatch || AST || align=right | 3.0 km || 
|-id=240 bgcolor=#E9E9E9
| 178240 ||  || — || December 6, 2006 || Palomar || NEAT || JUN || align=right | 2.3 km || 
|-id=241 bgcolor=#d6d6d6
| 178241 ||  || — || December 9, 2006 || Kitt Peak || Spacewatch || THM || align=right | 3.6 km || 
|-id=242 bgcolor=#d6d6d6
| 178242 || 2006 YX || — || December 16, 2006 || Kitt Peak || Spacewatch || — || align=right | 3.9 km || 
|-id=243 bgcolor=#E9E9E9
| 178243 Schaerding ||  ||  || December 22, 2006 || Gaisberg || R. Gierlinger || — || align=right | 2.4 km || 
|-id=244 bgcolor=#d6d6d6
| 178244 ||  || — || December 21, 2006 || Catalina || CSS || — || align=right | 4.4 km || 
|-id=245 bgcolor=#d6d6d6
| 178245 || 2007 BT || — || January 16, 2007 || Anderson Mesa || LONEOS || — || align=right | 4.5 km || 
|-id=246 bgcolor=#d6d6d6
| 178246 ||  || — || January 24, 2007 || Catalina || CSS || — || align=right | 4.8 km || 
|-id=247 bgcolor=#E9E9E9
| 178247 ||  || — || February 21, 2007 || RAS || A. Lowe || — || align=right | 3.4 km || 
|-id=248 bgcolor=#d6d6d6
| 178248 ||  || — || September 9, 2007 || Kitt Peak || Spacewatch || EOS || align=right | 6.0 km || 
|-id=249 bgcolor=#d6d6d6
| 178249 ||  || — || September 13, 2007 || Catalina || CSS || TIR || align=right | 4.6 km || 
|-id=250 bgcolor=#E9E9E9
| 178250 ||  || — || October 10, 2007 || Catalina || CSS || MAR || align=right | 3.0 km || 
|-id=251 bgcolor=#d6d6d6
| 178251 ||  || — || October 12, 2007 || Socorro || LINEAR || — || align=right | 6.1 km || 
|-id=252 bgcolor=#E9E9E9
| 178252 ||  || — || October 13, 2007 || Socorro || LINEAR || AGN || align=right | 2.0 km || 
|-id=253 bgcolor=#fefefe
| 178253 ||  || — || October 30, 2007 || Kitt Peak || Spacewatch || — || align=right | 1.7 km || 
|-id=254 bgcolor=#E9E9E9
| 178254 ||  || — || November 4, 2007 || Mount Lemmon || Mount Lemmon Survey || — || align=right | 3.9 km || 
|-id=255 bgcolor=#d6d6d6
| 178255 ||  || — || November 3, 2007 || Socorro || LINEAR || — || align=right | 6.8 km || 
|-id=256 bgcolor=#E9E9E9
| 178256 Juanmi ||  ||  || November 3, 2007 || La Cañada || J. Lacruz || AGN || align=right | 1.9 km || 
|-id=257 bgcolor=#fefefe
| 178257 ||  || — || November 3, 2007 || Kitt Peak || Spacewatch || V || align=right | 1.0 km || 
|-id=258 bgcolor=#E9E9E9
| 178258 ||  || — || November 4, 2007 || Mount Lemmon || Mount Lemmon Survey || — || align=right | 1.8 km || 
|-id=259 bgcolor=#E9E9E9
| 178259 ||  || — || November 7, 2007 || Mount Lemmon || Mount Lemmon Survey || — || align=right | 3.5 km || 
|-id=260 bgcolor=#E9E9E9
| 178260 ||  || — || November 14, 2007 || Kitt Peak || Spacewatch || EUN || align=right | 2.5 km || 
|-id=261 bgcolor=#E9E9E9
| 178261 ||  || — || November 14, 2007 || RAS || A. Lowe || — || align=right | 2.5 km || 
|-id=262 bgcolor=#E9E9E9
| 178262 ||  || — || November 18, 2007 || Socorro || LINEAR || — || align=right | 2.8 km || 
|-id=263 bgcolor=#d6d6d6
| 178263 Wienphilo ||  ||  || November 29, 2007 || Lulin Observatory || Q.-z. Ye || EUP || align=right | 6.0 km || 
|-id=264 bgcolor=#E9E9E9
| 178264 ||  || — || December 16, 2007 || Bergisch Gladbach || W. Bickel || MAR || align=right | 1.9 km || 
|-id=265 bgcolor=#fefefe
| 178265 ||  || — || December 31, 2007 || Mount Lemmon || Mount Lemmon Survey || NYS || align=right | 1.0 km || 
|-id=266 bgcolor=#fefefe
| 178266 ||  || — || December 30, 2007 || Mount Lemmon || Mount Lemmon Survey || — || align=right data-sort-value="0.86" | 860 m || 
|-id=267 bgcolor=#d6d6d6
| 178267 Sarajevo ||  ||  || December 31, 2007 || OAM || OAM Obs. || — || align=right | 6.1 km || 
|-id=268 bgcolor=#C2FFFF
| 178268 ||  || — || January 13, 2008 || Kitt Peak || Spacewatch || L5 || align=right | 16 km || 
|-id=269 bgcolor=#d6d6d6
| 178269 || 4178 P-L || — || September 24, 1960 || Palomar || PLS || — || align=right | 4.4 km || 
|-id=270 bgcolor=#E9E9E9
| 178270 || 6822 P-L || — || September 24, 1960 || Palomar || PLS || — || align=right | 1.4 km || 
|-id=271 bgcolor=#E9E9E9
| 178271 || 9084 P-L || — || October 17, 1960 || Palomar || PLS || — || align=right | 2.6 km || 
|-id=272 bgcolor=#d6d6d6
| 178272 || 1312 T-2 || — || September 29, 1973 || Palomar || PLS || — || align=right | 4.7 km || 
|-id=273 bgcolor=#E9E9E9
| 178273 || 1400 T-2 || — || September 29, 1973 || Palomar || PLS || — || align=right | 2.5 km || 
|-id=274 bgcolor=#fefefe
| 178274 || 2031 T-2 || — || September 29, 1973 || Palomar || PLS || — || align=right | 1.2 km || 
|-id=275 bgcolor=#E9E9E9
| 178275 || 4080 T-2 || — || September 29, 1973 || Palomar || PLS || — || align=right | 1.5 km || 
|-id=276 bgcolor=#E9E9E9
| 178276 || 5120 T-2 || — || September 25, 1973 || Palomar || PLS || — || align=right | 2.4 km || 
|-id=277 bgcolor=#fefefe
| 178277 || 5213 T-2 || — || September 25, 1973 || Palomar || PLS || FLO || align=right | 1.0 km || 
|-id=278 bgcolor=#fefefe
| 178278 || 2136 T-3 || — || October 16, 1977 || Palomar || PLS || — || align=right | 1.1 km || 
|-id=279 bgcolor=#E9E9E9
| 178279 || 2194 T-3 || — || October 16, 1977 || Palomar || PLS || — || align=right | 4.4 km || 
|-id=280 bgcolor=#fefefe
| 178280 || 2357 T-3 || — || October 16, 1977 || Palomar || PLS || ERI || align=right | 2.4 km || 
|-id=281 bgcolor=#E9E9E9
| 178281 || 2635 T-3 || — || October 16, 1977 || Palomar || PLS || — || align=right | 1.3 km || 
|-id=282 bgcolor=#fefefe
| 178282 || 3089 T-3 || — || October 16, 1977 || Palomar || PLS || — || align=right | 1.2 km || 
|-id=283 bgcolor=#E9E9E9
| 178283 || 4261 T-3 || — || October 16, 1977 || Palomar || PLS || — || align=right | 1.6 km || 
|-id=284 bgcolor=#d6d6d6
| 178284 ||  || — || November 29, 1978 || Palomar || S. J. Bus, C. T. Kowal || — || align=right | 6.2 km || 
|-id=285 bgcolor=#E9E9E9
| 178285 ||  || — || March 1, 1981 || Siding Spring || S. J. Bus || — || align=right | 3.6 km || 
|-id=286 bgcolor=#E9E9E9
| 178286 ||  || — || March 2, 1981 || Siding Spring || S. J. Bus || — || align=right | 2.7 km || 
|-id=287 bgcolor=#FA8072
| 178287 ||  || — || October 24, 1981 || Palomar || S. J. Bus || — || align=right | 1.5 km || 
|-id=288 bgcolor=#E9E9E9
| 178288 ||  || — || August 30, 1983 || Palomar || J. Gibson || — || align=right | 2.0 km || 
|-id=289 bgcolor=#fefefe
| 178289 ||  || — || October 7, 1989 || La Silla || E. W. Elst || NYS || align=right | 1.0 km || 
|-id=290 bgcolor=#E9E9E9
| 178290 ||  || — || October 7, 1989 || La Silla || E. W. Elst || — || align=right | 1.7 km || 
|-id=291 bgcolor=#C2FFFF
| 178291 ||  || — || October 29, 1989 || Cerro Tololo || S. J. Bus || L5 || align=right | 15 km || 
|-id=292 bgcolor=#d6d6d6
| 178292 ||  || — || August 17, 1990 || Palomar || A. Lowe || — || align=right | 4.6 km || 
|-id=293 bgcolor=#FA8072
| 178293 || 1990 SN || — || September 17, 1990 || Kitt Peak || Spacewatch || — || align=right | 1.1 km || 
|-id=294 bgcolor=#fefefe
| 178294 Wertheimer ||  ||  || October 11, 1990 || Tautenburg Observatory || F. Börngen, L. D. Schmadel || — || align=right | 1.3 km || 
|-id=295 bgcolor=#d6d6d6
| 178295 ||  || — || February 29, 1992 || La Silla || UESAC || SHU3:2 || align=right | 11 km || 
|-id=296 bgcolor=#E9E9E9
| 178296 ||  || — || September 26, 1992 || Kitt Peak || Spacewatch || — || align=right | 4.4 km || 
|-id=297 bgcolor=#fefefe
| 178297 ||  || — || March 19, 1993 || La Silla || UESAC || — || align=right | 1.3 km || 
|-id=298 bgcolor=#fefefe
| 178298 ||  || — || March 17, 1993 || La Silla || UESAC || NYS || align=right | 1.3 km || 
|-id=299 bgcolor=#d6d6d6
| 178299 ||  || — || March 17, 1993 || La Silla || UESAC || HIL3:2 || align=right | 7.6 km || 
|-id=300 bgcolor=#E9E9E9
| 178300 || 1993 ON || — || July 24, 1993 || Stroncone || A. Vagnozzi || — || align=right | 1.4 km || 
|}

178301–178400 

|-bgcolor=#E9E9E9
| 178301 ||  || — || August 18, 1993 || Caussols || E. W. Elst || — || align=right | 2.1 km || 
|-id=302 bgcolor=#E9E9E9
| 178302 ||  || — || October 15, 1993 || Kitt Peak || Spacewatch || — || align=right | 1.5 km || 
|-id=303 bgcolor=#E9E9E9
| 178303 ||  || — || October 9, 1993 || La Silla || E. W. Elst || — || align=right | 2.2 km || 
|-id=304 bgcolor=#fefefe
| 178304 ||  || — || April 6, 1994 || Kitt Peak || Spacewatch || H || align=right | 1.1 km || 
|-id=305 bgcolor=#fefefe
| 178305 ||  || — || April 15, 1994 || Kitt Peak || Spacewatch || FLO || align=right | 1.1 km || 
|-id=306 bgcolor=#fefefe
| 178306 ||  || — || August 12, 1994 || La Silla || E. W. Elst || NYS || align=right data-sort-value="0.99" | 990 m || 
|-id=307 bgcolor=#fefefe
| 178307 ||  || — || August 12, 1994 || La Silla || E. W. Elst || — || align=right | 1.4 km || 
|-id=308 bgcolor=#d6d6d6
| 178308 ||  || — || August 12, 1994 || La Silla || E. W. Elst || — || align=right | 3.8 km || 
|-id=309 bgcolor=#fefefe
| 178309 ||  || — || September 12, 1994 || Kitt Peak || Spacewatch || NYS || align=right data-sort-value="0.99" | 990 m || 
|-id=310 bgcolor=#d6d6d6
| 178310 ||  || — || September 12, 1994 || Kitt Peak || Spacewatch || — || align=right | 4.7 km || 
|-id=311 bgcolor=#d6d6d6
| 178311 ||  || — || September 28, 1994 || Kitt Peak || Spacewatch || — || align=right | 4.7 km || 
|-id=312 bgcolor=#d6d6d6
| 178312 ||  || — || September 28, 1994 || Kitt Peak || Spacewatch || — || align=right | 3.8 km || 
|-id=313 bgcolor=#fefefe
| 178313 ||  || — || October 4, 1994 || Kitt Peak || Spacewatch || — || align=right | 1.5 km || 
|-id=314 bgcolor=#fefefe
| 178314 ||  || — || October 8, 1994 || Kitt Peak || Spacewatch || NYS || align=right | 1.1 km || 
|-id=315 bgcolor=#d6d6d6
| 178315 ||  || — || October 6, 1994 || Kitt Peak || Spacewatch || — || align=right | 4.0 km || 
|-id=316 bgcolor=#fefefe
| 178316 ||  || — || February 1, 1995 || Kitt Peak || Spacewatch || — || align=right data-sort-value="0.89" | 890 m || 
|-id=317 bgcolor=#E9E9E9
| 178317 ||  || — || February 24, 1995 || Kitt Peak || Spacewatch || EUN || align=right | 1.8 km || 
|-id=318 bgcolor=#fefefe
| 178318 ||  || — || March 23, 1995 || Kitt Peak || Spacewatch || NYS || align=right | 1.0 km || 
|-id=319 bgcolor=#E9E9E9
| 178319 ||  || — || March 23, 1995 || Kitt Peak || Spacewatch || — || align=right | 1.8 km || 
|-id=320 bgcolor=#E9E9E9
| 178320 ||  || — || March 26, 1995 || Kitt Peak || Spacewatch || — || align=right | 2.0 km || 
|-id=321 bgcolor=#E9E9E9
| 178321 ||  || — || April 24, 1995 || Kitt Peak || Spacewatch || — || align=right | 3.5 km || 
|-id=322 bgcolor=#E9E9E9
| 178322 ||  || — || May 26, 1995 || Kitt Peak || Spacewatch || MAR || align=right | 1.7 km || 
|-id=323 bgcolor=#d6d6d6
| 178323 ||  || — || July 22, 1995 || Kitt Peak || Spacewatch || KOR || align=right | 2.0 km || 
|-id=324 bgcolor=#fefefe
| 178324 ||  || — || July 23, 1995 || Kitt Peak || Spacewatch || — || align=right | 1.0 km || 
|-id=325 bgcolor=#fefefe
| 178325 ||  || — || September 17, 1995 || Kitt Peak || Spacewatch || MAS || align=right data-sort-value="0.93" | 930 m || 
|-id=326 bgcolor=#d6d6d6
| 178326 ||  || — || September 18, 1995 || Kitt Peak || Spacewatch || THM || align=right | 3.0 km || 
|-id=327 bgcolor=#fefefe
| 178327 ||  || — || September 18, 1995 || Kitt Peak || Spacewatch || NYS || align=right data-sort-value="0.74" | 740 m || 
|-id=328 bgcolor=#fefefe
| 178328 ||  || — || September 21, 1995 || Kitt Peak || Spacewatch || V || align=right data-sort-value="0.73" | 730 m || 
|-id=329 bgcolor=#d6d6d6
| 178329 ||  || — || September 24, 1995 || Kitt Peak || Spacewatch || SAN || align=right | 2.4 km || 
|-id=330 bgcolor=#fefefe
| 178330 ||  || — || September 24, 1995 || Kitt Peak || Spacewatch || FLO || align=right | 1.2 km || 
|-id=331 bgcolor=#fefefe
| 178331 ||  || — || September 25, 1995 || Kitt Peak || Spacewatch || — || align=right | 1.0 km || 
|-id=332 bgcolor=#d6d6d6
| 178332 ||  || — || September 25, 1995 || Kitt Peak || Spacewatch || EOS || align=right | 2.5 km || 
|-id=333 bgcolor=#fefefe
| 178333 ||  || — || September 25, 1995 || Kitt Peak || Spacewatch || — || align=right | 1.1 km || 
|-id=334 bgcolor=#fefefe
| 178334 ||  || — || September 25, 1995 || Kitt Peak || Spacewatch || MAS || align=right | 1.1 km || 
|-id=335 bgcolor=#d6d6d6
| 178335 ||  || — || September 27, 1995 || Kitt Peak || Spacewatch || — || align=right | 2.8 km || 
|-id=336 bgcolor=#d6d6d6
| 178336 ||  || — || October 15, 1995 || Kitt Peak || Spacewatch || — || align=right | 3.9 km || 
|-id=337 bgcolor=#fefefe
| 178337 ||  || — || October 24, 1995 || Kleť || Kleť Obs. || FLO || align=right data-sort-value="0.94" | 940 m || 
|-id=338 bgcolor=#d6d6d6
| 178338 ||  || — || October 19, 1995 || Catalina Station || T. B. Spahr || — || align=right | 5.2 km || 
|-id=339 bgcolor=#d6d6d6
| 178339 ||  || — || October 19, 1995 || Kitt Peak || Spacewatch || — || align=right | 3.1 km || 
|-id=340 bgcolor=#fefefe
| 178340 ||  || — || October 20, 1995 || Kitt Peak || Spacewatch || MAS || align=right | 1.1 km || 
|-id=341 bgcolor=#fefefe
| 178341 ||  || — || October 21, 1995 || Kitt Peak || Spacewatch || NYS || align=right data-sort-value="0.81" | 810 m || 
|-id=342 bgcolor=#fefefe
| 178342 ||  || — || October 22, 1995 || Kitt Peak || Spacewatch || V || align=right data-sort-value="0.75" | 750 m || 
|-id=343 bgcolor=#fefefe
| 178343 ||  || — || November 14, 1995 || Kitt Peak || Spacewatch || MAS || align=right data-sort-value="0.86" | 860 m || 
|-id=344 bgcolor=#d6d6d6
| 178344 ||  || — || November 15, 1995 || Kitt Peak || Spacewatch || — || align=right | 2.9 km || 
|-id=345 bgcolor=#fefefe
| 178345 ||  || — || November 15, 1995 || Kitt Peak || Spacewatch || V || align=right data-sort-value="0.80" | 800 m || 
|-id=346 bgcolor=#E9E9E9
| 178346 ||  || — || November 19, 1995 || Farra d'Isonzo || Farra d'Isonzo || — || align=right | 2.3 km || 
|-id=347 bgcolor=#fefefe
| 178347 ||  || — || November 16, 1995 || Kitt Peak || Spacewatch || — || align=right | 1.0 km || 
|-id=348 bgcolor=#fefefe
| 178348 ||  || — || November 17, 1995 || Kitt Peak || Spacewatch || ERI || align=right | 2.8 km || 
|-id=349 bgcolor=#fefefe
| 178349 ||  || — || November 19, 1995 || Kitt Peak || Spacewatch || NYS || align=right data-sort-value="0.72" | 720 m || 
|-id=350 bgcolor=#d6d6d6
| 178350 ||  || — || December 22, 1995 || Kitt Peak || Spacewatch || — || align=right | 5.6 km || 
|-id=351 bgcolor=#d6d6d6
| 178351 ||  || — || January 12, 1996 || Kitt Peak || Spacewatch || HYG || align=right | 3.9 km || 
|-id=352 bgcolor=#E9E9E9
| 178352 ||  || — || March 11, 1996 || Kitt Peak || Spacewatch || — || align=right | 1.7 km || 
|-id=353 bgcolor=#E9E9E9
| 178353 ||  || — || April 11, 1996 || Kitt Peak || Spacewatch || — || align=right | 1.4 km || 
|-id=354 bgcolor=#fefefe
| 178354 || 1996 RX || — || September 10, 1996 || Haleakala || NEAT || H || align=right data-sort-value="0.83" | 830 m || 
|-id=355 bgcolor=#E9E9E9
| 178355 ||  || — || September 7, 1996 || Kitt Peak || Spacewatch || AST || align=right | 3.1 km || 
|-id=356 bgcolor=#E9E9E9
| 178356 ||  || — || September 8, 1996 || Kitt Peak || Spacewatch || — || align=right | 3.4 km || 
|-id=357 bgcolor=#fefefe
| 178357 ||  || — || September 5, 1996 || Kitt Peak || Spacewatch || — || align=right data-sort-value="0.80" | 800 m || 
|-id=358 bgcolor=#E9E9E9
| 178358 ||  || — || October 8, 1996 || Kitt Peak || Spacewatch || — || align=right | 3.2 km || 
|-id=359 bgcolor=#fefefe
| 178359 ||  || — || November 3, 1996 || Kitt Peak || Spacewatch || FLO || align=right data-sort-value="0.95" | 950 m || 
|-id=360 bgcolor=#d6d6d6
| 178360 ||  || — || November 11, 1996 || Kitt Peak || Spacewatch || — || align=right | 3.1 km || 
|-id=361 bgcolor=#fefefe
| 178361 ||  || — || November 28, 1996 || Xinglong || SCAP || — || align=right | 1.8 km || 
|-id=362 bgcolor=#fefefe
| 178362 ||  || — || December 4, 1996 || Kitt Peak || Spacewatch || V || align=right data-sort-value="0.92" | 920 m || 
|-id=363 bgcolor=#fefefe
| 178363 ||  || — || January 8, 1997 || Prescott || P. G. Comba || V || align=right | 1.2 km || 
|-id=364 bgcolor=#d6d6d6
| 178364 ||  || — || January 9, 1997 || Kitt Peak || Spacewatch || ALA || align=right | 6.8 km || 
|-id=365 bgcolor=#d6d6d6
| 178365 ||  || — || January 31, 1997 || Kitt Peak || Spacewatch || — || align=right | 3.8 km || 
|-id=366 bgcolor=#fefefe
| 178366 ||  || — || February 1, 1997 || Kitt Peak || Spacewatch || NYS || align=right data-sort-value="0.90" | 900 m || 
|-id=367 bgcolor=#fefefe
| 178367 ||  || — || February 3, 1997 || Kitt Peak || Spacewatch || FLO || align=right | 1.3 km || 
|-id=368 bgcolor=#fefefe
| 178368 ||  || — || February 9, 1997 || Kitt Peak || Spacewatch || — || align=right | 1.1 km || 
|-id=369 bgcolor=#fefefe
| 178369 ||  || — || February 7, 1997 || Kitt Peak || Spacewatch || — || align=right data-sort-value="0.90" | 900 m || 
|-id=370 bgcolor=#fefefe
| 178370 ||  || — || March 2, 1997 || Kitt Peak || Spacewatch || MAS || align=right data-sort-value="0.91" | 910 m || 
|-id=371 bgcolor=#d6d6d6
| 178371 ||  || — || March 2, 1997 || Kitt Peak || Spacewatch || HYG || align=right | 3.7 km || 
|-id=372 bgcolor=#d6d6d6
| 178372 ||  || — || March 7, 1997 || Kitt Peak || Spacewatch || URS || align=right | 4.8 km || 
|-id=373 bgcolor=#fefefe
| 178373 ||  || — || March 4, 1997 || Kitt Peak || Spacewatch || V || align=right data-sort-value="0.87" | 870 m || 
|-id=374 bgcolor=#d6d6d6
| 178374 ||  || — || April 7, 1997 || Kitt Peak || Spacewatch || — || align=right | 3.6 km || 
|-id=375 bgcolor=#fefefe
| 178375 ||  || — || April 3, 1997 || Socorro || LINEAR || — || align=right | 1.5 km || 
|-id=376 bgcolor=#E9E9E9
| 178376 ||  || — || April 3, 1997 || Socorro || LINEAR || EUN || align=right | 2.3 km || 
|-id=377 bgcolor=#fefefe
| 178377 ||  || — || April 5, 1997 || Socorro || LINEAR || — || align=right | 1.5 km || 
|-id=378 bgcolor=#fefefe
| 178378 ||  || — || April 7, 1997 || Kitt Peak || Spacewatch || NYS || align=right data-sort-value="0.99" | 990 m || 
|-id=379 bgcolor=#d6d6d6
| 178379 ||  || — || April 28, 1997 || Kitt Peak || Spacewatch || — || align=right | 3.8 km || 
|-id=380 bgcolor=#d6d6d6
| 178380 ||  || — || May 28, 1997 || Bergisch Gladbach || W. Bickel || — || align=right | 5.4 km || 
|-id=381 bgcolor=#E9E9E9
| 178381 ||  || — || July 2, 1997 || Kitt Peak || Spacewatch || — || align=right | 4.0 km || 
|-id=382 bgcolor=#E9E9E9
| 178382 ||  || — || July 7, 1997 || Kitt Peak || Spacewatch || — || align=right | 2.1 km || 
|-id=383 bgcolor=#E9E9E9
| 178383 ||  || — || August 5, 1997 || Mallorca || Á. López J., R. Pacheco || RAF || align=right | 1.7 km || 
|-id=384 bgcolor=#E9E9E9
| 178384 ||  || — || September 28, 1997 || Kitt Peak || Spacewatch || — || align=right | 1.3 km || 
|-id=385 bgcolor=#E9E9E9
| 178385 ||  || — || October 3, 1997 || Kitt Peak || Spacewatch || — || align=right | 1.1 km || 
|-id=386 bgcolor=#E9E9E9
| 178386 ||  || — || October 7, 1997 || Kitt Peak || Spacewatch || — || align=right | 2.1 km || 
|-id=387 bgcolor=#C2FFFF
| 178387 ||  || — || October 11, 1997 || Kitt Peak || Spacewatch || L4 || align=right | 15 km || 
|-id=388 bgcolor=#E9E9E9
| 178388 ||  || — || October 21, 1997 || Kitt Peak || Spacewatch || — || align=right | 2.4 km || 
|-id=389 bgcolor=#E9E9E9
| 178389 ||  || — || November 21, 1997 || Kitt Peak || Spacewatch || — || align=right | 1.4 km || 
|-id=390 bgcolor=#d6d6d6
| 178390 ||  || — || March 1, 1998 || Xinglong || SCAP || YAK || align=right | 4.0 km || 
|-id=391 bgcolor=#d6d6d6
| 178391 ||  || — || March 20, 1998 || Kitt Peak || Spacewatch || — || align=right | 3.5 km || 
|-id=392 bgcolor=#fefefe
| 178392 ||  || — || March 20, 1998 || Socorro || LINEAR || FLO || align=right | 1.2 km || 
|-id=393 bgcolor=#d6d6d6
| 178393 ||  || — || March 20, 1998 || Socorro || LINEAR || — || align=right | 6.3 km || 
|-id=394 bgcolor=#fefefe
| 178394 ||  || — || April 24, 1998 || Kitt Peak || Spacewatch || — || align=right data-sort-value="0.78" | 780 m || 
|-id=395 bgcolor=#fefefe
| 178395 ||  || — || April 23, 1998 || Socorro || LINEAR || — || align=right | 1.2 km || 
|-id=396 bgcolor=#fefefe
| 178396 ||  || — || April 21, 1998 || Socorro || LINEAR || FLO || align=right | 1.1 km || 
|-id=397 bgcolor=#fefefe
| 178397 ||  || — || April 21, 1998 || Socorro || LINEAR || FLO || align=right | 1.2 km || 
|-id=398 bgcolor=#fefefe
| 178398 ||  || — || May 29, 1998 || Kitt Peak || Spacewatch || V || align=right | 1.1 km || 
|-id=399 bgcolor=#d6d6d6
| 178399 ||  || — || June 25, 1998 || Kitt Peak || Spacewatch || — || align=right | 4.5 km || 
|-id=400 bgcolor=#fefefe
| 178400 ||  || — || July 26, 1998 || La Silla || E. W. Elst || — || align=right | 1.6 km || 
|}

178401–178500 

|-bgcolor=#fefefe
| 178401 ||  || — || August 17, 1998 || Socorro || LINEAR || — || align=right | 1.4 km || 
|-id=402 bgcolor=#fefefe
| 178402 ||  || — || August 17, 1998 || Socorro || LINEAR || — || align=right | 1.5 km || 
|-id=403 bgcolor=#fefefe
| 178403 ||  || — || August 17, 1998 || Socorro || LINEAR || H || align=right | 1.00 km || 
|-id=404 bgcolor=#fefefe
| 178404 ||  || — || August 17, 1998 || Reedy Creek || J. Broughton || — || align=right | 1.2 km || 
|-id=405 bgcolor=#fefefe
| 178405 ||  || — || August 17, 1998 || Socorro || LINEAR || — || align=right | 3.2 km || 
|-id=406 bgcolor=#E9E9E9
| 178406 ||  || — || August 24, 1998 || Reedy Creek || J. Broughton || — || align=right | 1.5 km || 
|-id=407 bgcolor=#fefefe
| 178407 ||  || — || August 26, 1998 || Kitt Peak || Spacewatch || NYS || align=right | 1.4 km || 
|-id=408 bgcolor=#E9E9E9
| 178408 || 1998 RR || — || September 9, 1998 || Caussols || ODAS || — || align=right | 2.5 km || 
|-id=409 bgcolor=#fefefe
| 178409 ||  || — || September 14, 1998 || Socorro || LINEAR || H || align=right data-sort-value="0.82" | 820 m || 
|-id=410 bgcolor=#fefefe
| 178410 ||  || — || September 14, 1998 || Anderson Mesa || LONEOS || — || align=right | 1.7 km || 
|-id=411 bgcolor=#fefefe
| 178411 ||  || — || September 13, 1998 || Kitt Peak || Spacewatch || — || align=right | 1.4 km || 
|-id=412 bgcolor=#E9E9E9
| 178412 ||  || — || September 14, 1998 || Socorro || LINEAR || — || align=right | 1.0 km || 
|-id=413 bgcolor=#fefefe
| 178413 ||  || — || September 14, 1998 || Socorro || LINEAR || FLO || align=right | 1.2 km || 
|-id=414 bgcolor=#fefefe
| 178414 ||  || — || September 14, 1998 || Socorro || LINEAR || NYS || align=right | 1.1 km || 
|-id=415 bgcolor=#fefefe
| 178415 ||  || — || September 14, 1998 || Socorro || LINEAR || NYS || align=right | 1.5 km || 
|-id=416 bgcolor=#fefefe
| 178416 ||  || — || September 14, 1998 || Socorro || LINEAR || — || align=right | 1.5 km || 
|-id=417 bgcolor=#E9E9E9
| 178417 ||  || — || September 14, 1998 || Socorro || LINEAR || MIT || align=right | 2.4 km || 
|-id=418 bgcolor=#fefefe
| 178418 ||  || — || September 14, 1998 || Socorro || LINEAR || NYS || align=right | 1.2 km || 
|-id=419 bgcolor=#fefefe
| 178419 ||  || — || September 14, 1998 || Socorro || LINEAR || V || align=right | 1.5 km || 
|-id=420 bgcolor=#E9E9E9
| 178420 ||  || — || September 20, 1998 || Kitt Peak || Spacewatch || — || align=right | 2.0 km || 
|-id=421 bgcolor=#fefefe
| 178421 ||  || — || September 19, 1998 || Socorro || LINEAR || H || align=right | 1.1 km || 
|-id=422 bgcolor=#fefefe
| 178422 ||  || — || September 26, 1998 || Socorro || LINEAR || H || align=right | 1.4 km || 
|-id=423 bgcolor=#fefefe
| 178423 ||  || — || September 20, 1998 || Kitt Peak || Spacewatch || — || align=right | 1.5 km || 
|-id=424 bgcolor=#fefefe
| 178424 ||  || — || September 26, 1998 || Socorro || LINEAR || — || align=right | 1.9 km || 
|-id=425 bgcolor=#fefefe
| 178425 ||  || — || September 26, 1998 || Socorro || LINEAR || — || align=right | 1.4 km || 
|-id=426 bgcolor=#fefefe
| 178426 ||  || — || September 26, 1998 || Socorro || LINEAR || MAS || align=right | 1.3 km || 
|-id=427 bgcolor=#fefefe
| 178427 ||  || — || September 26, 1998 || Socorro || LINEAR || V || align=right | 1.2 km || 
|-id=428 bgcolor=#fefefe
| 178428 ||  || — || September 26, 1998 || Socorro || LINEAR || — || align=right | 1.6 km || 
|-id=429 bgcolor=#E9E9E9
| 178429 ||  || — || September 18, 1998 || La Silla || E. W. Elst || — || align=right | 3.1 km || 
|-id=430 bgcolor=#E9E9E9
| 178430 ||  || — || September 16, 1998 || Anderson Mesa || LONEOS || — || align=right | 1.5 km || 
|-id=431 bgcolor=#fefefe
| 178431 ||  || — || October 14, 1998 || Catalina || CSS || H || align=right | 1.1 km || 
|-id=432 bgcolor=#E9E9E9
| 178432 ||  || — || October 14, 1998 || Caussols || ODAS || — || align=right | 1.1 km || 
|-id=433 bgcolor=#E9E9E9
| 178433 ||  || — || October 20, 1998 || Caussols || ODAS || — || align=right | 1.7 km || 
|-id=434 bgcolor=#fefefe
| 178434 ||  || — || October 20, 1998 || Caussols || ODAS || — || align=right | 1.6 km || 
|-id=435 bgcolor=#E9E9E9
| 178435 ||  || — || October 18, 1998 || La Silla || E. W. Elst || — || align=right | 2.7 km || 
|-id=436 bgcolor=#fefefe
| 178436 ||  || — || October 28, 1998 || Socorro || LINEAR || V || align=right | 1.4 km || 
|-id=437 bgcolor=#fefefe
| 178437 ||  || — || November 10, 1998 || Caussols || ODAS || MAS || align=right | 1.2 km || 
|-id=438 bgcolor=#E9E9E9
| 178438 ||  || — || November 23, 1998 || Kitt Peak || Spacewatch || — || align=right | 1.5 km || 
|-id=439 bgcolor=#E9E9E9
| 178439 ||  || — || November 18, 1998 || Socorro || LINEAR || — || align=right | 1.3 km || 
|-id=440 bgcolor=#E9E9E9
| 178440 ||  || — || December 11, 1998 || Kitt Peak || Spacewatch || — || align=right | 2.4 km || 
|-id=441 bgcolor=#E9E9E9
| 178441 ||  || — || January 14, 1999 || Catalina || CSS || BAR || align=right | 1.8 km || 
|-id=442 bgcolor=#E9E9E9
| 178442 ||  || — || February 10, 1999 || Socorro || LINEAR || — || align=right | 1.9 km || 
|-id=443 bgcolor=#E9E9E9
| 178443 ||  || — || February 12, 1999 || Socorro || LINEAR || JUN || align=right | 1.9 km || 
|-id=444 bgcolor=#E9E9E9
| 178444 ||  || — || February 10, 1999 || Socorro || LINEAR || — || align=right | 3.9 km || 
|-id=445 bgcolor=#E9E9E9
| 178445 ||  || — || February 10, 1999 || Xinglong || SCAP || — || align=right | 4.4 km || 
|-id=446 bgcolor=#E9E9E9
| 178446 ||  || — || February 9, 1999 || Kitt Peak || Spacewatch || — || align=right | 1.6 km || 
|-id=447 bgcolor=#E9E9E9
| 178447 ||  || — || February 10, 1999 || Kitt Peak || Spacewatch || — || align=right | 1.9 km || 
|-id=448 bgcolor=#E9E9E9
| 178448 ||  || — || March 19, 1999 || Kitt Peak || Spacewatch || — || align=right | 3.8 km || 
|-id=449 bgcolor=#E9E9E9
| 178449 ||  || — || March 20, 1999 || Kitt Peak || Spacewatch || — || align=right | 3.0 km || 
|-id=450 bgcolor=#E9E9E9
| 178450 ||  || — || April 6, 1999 || Kitt Peak || Spacewatch || AGN || align=right | 1.5 km || 
|-id=451 bgcolor=#fefefe
| 178451 ||  || — || April 14, 1999 || Kitt Peak || Spacewatch || — || align=right data-sort-value="0.98" | 980 m || 
|-id=452 bgcolor=#E9E9E9
| 178452 ||  || — || April 18, 1999 || Kitt Peak || Spacewatch || NEM || align=right | 3.9 km || 
|-id=453 bgcolor=#E9E9E9
| 178453 ||  || — || May 8, 1999 || Catalina || CSS || — || align=right | 3.6 km || 
|-id=454 bgcolor=#E9E9E9
| 178454 ||  || — || May 12, 1999 || Socorro || LINEAR || — || align=right | 4.2 km || 
|-id=455 bgcolor=#fefefe
| 178455 ||  || — || July 13, 1999 || Socorro || LINEAR || FLO || align=right data-sort-value="0.99" | 990 m || 
|-id=456 bgcolor=#fefefe
| 178456 ||  || — || July 14, 1999 || Socorro || LINEAR || FLO || align=right data-sort-value="0.92" | 920 m || 
|-id=457 bgcolor=#fefefe
| 178457 ||  || — || September 8, 1999 || Socorro || LINEAR || PHO || align=right | 2.0 km || 
|-id=458 bgcolor=#d6d6d6
| 178458 ||  || — || September 7, 1999 || Socorro || LINEAR || — || align=right | 3.0 km || 
|-id=459 bgcolor=#d6d6d6
| 178459 ||  || — || September 7, 1999 || Socorro || LINEAR || — || align=right | 3.7 km || 
|-id=460 bgcolor=#d6d6d6
| 178460 ||  || — || September 7, 1999 || Socorro || LINEAR || URS || align=right | 6.7 km || 
|-id=461 bgcolor=#fefefe
| 178461 ||  || — || September 7, 1999 || Socorro || LINEAR || FLO || align=right data-sort-value="0.96" | 960 m || 
|-id=462 bgcolor=#fefefe
| 178462 ||  || — || September 7, 1999 || Socorro || LINEAR || — || align=right | 1.2 km || 
|-id=463 bgcolor=#fefefe
| 178463 ||  || — || September 7, 1999 || Socorro || LINEAR || — || align=right | 1.4 km || 
|-id=464 bgcolor=#fefefe
| 178464 ||  || — || September 7, 1999 || Socorro || LINEAR || FLO || align=right | 1.0 km || 
|-id=465 bgcolor=#d6d6d6
| 178465 ||  || — || September 7, 1999 || Socorro || LINEAR || — || align=right | 5.0 km || 
|-id=466 bgcolor=#fefefe
| 178466 ||  || — || September 8, 1999 || Socorro || LINEAR || FLO || align=right | 1.3 km || 
|-id=467 bgcolor=#fefefe
| 178467 ||  || — || September 9, 1999 || Socorro || LINEAR || FLO || align=right | 1.1 km || 
|-id=468 bgcolor=#fefefe
| 178468 ||  || — || September 9, 1999 || Socorro || LINEAR || — || align=right | 1.4 km || 
|-id=469 bgcolor=#fefefe
| 178469 ||  || — || September 9, 1999 || Socorro || LINEAR || V || align=right | 1.0 km || 
|-id=470 bgcolor=#fefefe
| 178470 ||  || — || September 9, 1999 || Socorro || LINEAR || FLO || align=right | 1.1 km || 
|-id=471 bgcolor=#fefefe
| 178471 ||  || — || September 9, 1999 || Socorro || LINEAR || FLO || align=right data-sort-value="0.98" | 980 m || 
|-id=472 bgcolor=#d6d6d6
| 178472 ||  || — || September 9, 1999 || Socorro || LINEAR || HYG || align=right | 4.4 km || 
|-id=473 bgcolor=#fefefe
| 178473 ||  || — || September 9, 1999 || Socorro || LINEAR || FLO || align=right | 1.2 km || 
|-id=474 bgcolor=#fefefe
| 178474 ||  || — || September 9, 1999 || Socorro || LINEAR || V || align=right data-sort-value="0.89" | 890 m || 
|-id=475 bgcolor=#d6d6d6
| 178475 ||  || — || September 9, 1999 || Socorro || LINEAR || — || align=right | 2.9 km || 
|-id=476 bgcolor=#d6d6d6
| 178476 ||  || — || September 9, 1999 || Socorro || LINEAR || — || align=right | 4.7 km || 
|-id=477 bgcolor=#d6d6d6
| 178477 ||  || — || September 11, 1999 || Socorro || LINEAR || EOS || align=right | 4.3 km || 
|-id=478 bgcolor=#fefefe
| 178478 ||  || — || September 8, 1999 || Catalina || CSS || — || align=right | 1.6 km || 
|-id=479 bgcolor=#d6d6d6
| 178479 ||  || — || September 8, 1999 || Kitt Peak || Spacewatch || EOS || align=right | 4.5 km || 
|-id=480 bgcolor=#fefefe
| 178480 ||  || — || October 4, 1999 || Socorro || LINEAR || V || align=right data-sort-value="0.99" | 990 m || 
|-id=481 bgcolor=#fefefe
| 178481 ||  || — || October 4, 1999 || Socorro || LINEAR || — || align=right | 2.0 km || 
|-id=482 bgcolor=#fefefe
| 178482 ||  || — || October 3, 1999 || Kitt Peak || Spacewatch || NYS || align=right data-sort-value="0.90" | 900 m || 
|-id=483 bgcolor=#fefefe
| 178483 ||  || — || October 4, 1999 || Kitt Peak || Spacewatch || — || align=right | 1.2 km || 
|-id=484 bgcolor=#fefefe
| 178484 ||  || — || October 7, 1999 || Kitt Peak || Spacewatch || NYS || align=right | 1.0 km || 
|-id=485 bgcolor=#d6d6d6
| 178485 ||  || — || October 15, 1999 || Socorro || LINEAR || — || align=right | 3.0 km || 
|-id=486 bgcolor=#fefefe
| 178486 ||  || — || October 8, 1999 || Kitt Peak || Spacewatch || NYS || align=right data-sort-value="0.74" | 740 m || 
|-id=487 bgcolor=#fefefe
| 178487 ||  || — || October 8, 1999 || Kitt Peak || Spacewatch || NYS || align=right | 1.0 km || 
|-id=488 bgcolor=#d6d6d6
| 178488 ||  || — || October 10, 1999 || Kitt Peak || Spacewatch || EOS || align=right | 2.9 km || 
|-id=489 bgcolor=#fefefe
| 178489 ||  || — || October 10, 1999 || Kitt Peak || Spacewatch || — || align=right | 1.4 km || 
|-id=490 bgcolor=#d6d6d6
| 178490 ||  || — || October 12, 1999 || Kitt Peak || Spacewatch || HYG || align=right | 3.7 km || 
|-id=491 bgcolor=#fefefe
| 178491 ||  || — || October 2, 1999 || Socorro || LINEAR || FLO || align=right data-sort-value="0.98" | 980 m || 
|-id=492 bgcolor=#fefefe
| 178492 ||  || — || October 3, 1999 || Socorro || LINEAR || FLO || align=right data-sort-value="0.99" | 990 m || 
|-id=493 bgcolor=#fefefe
| 178493 ||  || — || October 4, 1999 || Socorro || LINEAR || V || align=right data-sort-value="0.95" | 950 m || 
|-id=494 bgcolor=#fefefe
| 178494 ||  || — || October 4, 1999 || Socorro || LINEAR || — || align=right | 1.1 km || 
|-id=495 bgcolor=#fefefe
| 178495 ||  || — || October 4, 1999 || Socorro || LINEAR || NYS || align=right data-sort-value="0.92" | 920 m || 
|-id=496 bgcolor=#fefefe
| 178496 ||  || — || October 4, 1999 || Socorro || LINEAR || FLO || align=right data-sort-value="0.92" | 920 m || 
|-id=497 bgcolor=#d6d6d6
| 178497 ||  || — || October 4, 1999 || Socorro || LINEAR || — || align=right | 4.7 km || 
|-id=498 bgcolor=#fefefe
| 178498 ||  || — || October 4, 1999 || Socorro || LINEAR || NYS || align=right | 2.6 km || 
|-id=499 bgcolor=#fefefe
| 178499 ||  || — || October 4, 1999 || Socorro || LINEAR || FLO || align=right | 1.6 km || 
|-id=500 bgcolor=#d6d6d6
| 178500 ||  || — || October 6, 1999 || Socorro || LINEAR || — || align=right | 4.6 km || 
|}

178501–178600 

|-bgcolor=#fefefe
| 178501 ||  || — || October 6, 1999 || Socorro || LINEAR || NYS || align=right data-sort-value="0.95" | 950 m || 
|-id=502 bgcolor=#fefefe
| 178502 ||  || — || October 6, 1999 || Socorro || LINEAR || NYS || align=right | 1.00 km || 
|-id=503 bgcolor=#fefefe
| 178503 ||  || — || October 7, 1999 || Socorro || LINEAR || — || align=right | 2.5 km || 
|-id=504 bgcolor=#fefefe
| 178504 ||  || — || October 7, 1999 || Socorro || LINEAR || NYS || align=right | 1.0 km || 
|-id=505 bgcolor=#fefefe
| 178505 ||  || — || October 7, 1999 || Socorro || LINEAR || — || align=right | 1.1 km || 
|-id=506 bgcolor=#fefefe
| 178506 ||  || — || October 7, 1999 || Socorro || LINEAR || — || align=right | 1.6 km || 
|-id=507 bgcolor=#fefefe
| 178507 ||  || — || October 7, 1999 || Socorro || LINEAR || V || align=right | 1.3 km || 
|-id=508 bgcolor=#fefefe
| 178508 ||  || — || October 9, 1999 || Socorro || LINEAR || NYS || align=right | 1.2 km || 
|-id=509 bgcolor=#fefefe
| 178509 ||  || — || October 9, 1999 || Socorro || LINEAR || NYS || align=right data-sort-value="0.88" | 880 m || 
|-id=510 bgcolor=#fefefe
| 178510 ||  || — || October 10, 1999 || Socorro || LINEAR || FLO || align=right data-sort-value="0.95" | 950 m || 
|-id=511 bgcolor=#d6d6d6
| 178511 ||  || — || October 10, 1999 || Socorro || LINEAR || — || align=right | 7.0 km || 
|-id=512 bgcolor=#fefefe
| 178512 ||  || — || October 10, 1999 || Socorro || LINEAR || — || align=right | 1.4 km || 
|-id=513 bgcolor=#E9E9E9
| 178513 ||  || — || October 10, 1999 || Socorro || LINEAR || — || align=right | 1.9 km || 
|-id=514 bgcolor=#E9E9E9
| 178514 ||  || — || October 10, 1999 || Socorro || LINEAR || — || align=right | 1.8 km || 
|-id=515 bgcolor=#fefefe
| 178515 ||  || — || October 12, 1999 || Socorro || LINEAR || FLO || align=right | 1.2 km || 
|-id=516 bgcolor=#FA8072
| 178516 ||  || — || October 13, 1999 || Socorro || LINEAR || — || align=right | 1.2 km || 
|-id=517 bgcolor=#d6d6d6
| 178517 ||  || — || October 13, 1999 || Socorro || LINEAR || — || align=right | 2.9 km || 
|-id=518 bgcolor=#fefefe
| 178518 ||  || — || October 14, 1999 || Socorro || LINEAR || H || align=right | 1.3 km || 
|-id=519 bgcolor=#d6d6d6
| 178519 ||  || — || October 15, 1999 || Socorro || LINEAR || HYG || align=right | 5.2 km || 
|-id=520 bgcolor=#fefefe
| 178520 ||  || — || October 15, 1999 || Socorro || LINEAR || FLO || align=right data-sort-value="0.94" | 940 m || 
|-id=521 bgcolor=#fefefe
| 178521 ||  || — || October 2, 1999 || Socorro || LINEAR || — || align=right | 1.5 km || 
|-id=522 bgcolor=#fefefe
| 178522 ||  || — || October 2, 1999 || Kitt Peak || Spacewatch || NYS || align=right data-sort-value="0.90" | 900 m || 
|-id=523 bgcolor=#fefefe
| 178523 ||  || — || October 4, 1999 || Kitt Peak || Spacewatch || — || align=right | 1.3 km || 
|-id=524 bgcolor=#fefefe
| 178524 ||  || — || October 3, 1999 || Anderson Mesa || LONEOS || FLO || align=right | 1.3 km || 
|-id=525 bgcolor=#fefefe
| 178525 ||  || — || October 8, 1999 || Catalina || CSS || NYS || align=right | 1.3 km || 
|-id=526 bgcolor=#E9E9E9
| 178526 ||  || — || October 6, 1999 || Socorro || LINEAR || — || align=right | 1.2 km || 
|-id=527 bgcolor=#fefefe
| 178527 ||  || — || October 10, 1999 || Kitt Peak || Spacewatch || MAS || align=right | 1.1 km || 
|-id=528 bgcolor=#d6d6d6
| 178528 ||  || — || October 8, 1999 || Socorro || LINEAR || — || align=right | 6.9 km || 
|-id=529 bgcolor=#fefefe
| 178529 ||  || — || October 10, 1999 || Socorro || LINEAR || — || align=right | 1.5 km || 
|-id=530 bgcolor=#fefefe
| 178530 ||  || — || October 10, 1999 || Socorro || LINEAR || FLO || align=right | 1.0 km || 
|-id=531 bgcolor=#fefefe
| 178531 ||  || — || October 11, 1999 || Socorro || LINEAR || — || align=right data-sort-value="0.98" | 980 m || 
|-id=532 bgcolor=#fefefe
| 178532 ||  || — || October 6, 1999 || Socorro || LINEAR || NYS || align=right data-sort-value="0.81" | 810 m || 
|-id=533 bgcolor=#fefefe
| 178533 ||  || — || October 12, 1999 || Kitt Peak || Spacewatch || — || align=right | 1.2 km || 
|-id=534 bgcolor=#E9E9E9
| 178534 Mosheelitzur ||  ||  || October 13, 1999 || Apache Point || SDSS || — || align=right | 1.8 km || 
|-id=535 bgcolor=#fefefe
| 178535 || 1999 UA || — || October 16, 1999 || Ondřejov || P. Pravec, P. Kušnirák || — || align=right | 1.5 km || 
|-id=536 bgcolor=#fefefe
| 178536 ||  || — || October 31, 1999 || Socorro || LINEAR || H || align=right | 1.1 km || 
|-id=537 bgcolor=#fefefe
| 178537 ||  || — || October 29, 1999 || Catalina || CSS || — || align=right | 1.1 km || 
|-id=538 bgcolor=#d6d6d6
| 178538 ||  || — || October 30, 1999 || Kitt Peak || Spacewatch || — || align=right | 3.9 km || 
|-id=539 bgcolor=#fefefe
| 178539 ||  || — || October 31, 1999 || Kitt Peak || Spacewatch || — || align=right | 1.1 km || 
|-id=540 bgcolor=#fefefe
| 178540 ||  || — || October 16, 1999 || Kitt Peak || Spacewatch || — || align=right | 1.3 km || 
|-id=541 bgcolor=#d6d6d6
| 178541 ||  || — || October 31, 1999 || Catalina || CSS || LIX || align=right | 8.2 km || 
|-id=542 bgcolor=#E9E9E9
| 178542 ||  || — || October 22, 1999 || Socorro || LINEAR || — || align=right | 1.9 km || 
|-id=543 bgcolor=#fefefe
| 178543 ||  || — || November 3, 1999 || Heppenheim || Starkenburg Obs. || V || align=right data-sort-value="0.93" | 930 m || 
|-id=544 bgcolor=#fefefe
| 178544 ||  || — || November 2, 1999 || Kitt Peak || Spacewatch || NYS || align=right data-sort-value="0.93" | 930 m || 
|-id=545 bgcolor=#E9E9E9
| 178545 ||  || — || November 10, 1999 || Višnjan Observatory || K. Korlević || — || align=right | 1.6 km || 
|-id=546 bgcolor=#E9E9E9
| 178546 ||  || — || November 3, 1999 || Socorro || LINEAR || MAR || align=right | 1.8 km || 
|-id=547 bgcolor=#fefefe
| 178547 ||  || — || November 11, 1999 || Kitt Peak || Spacewatch || V || align=right data-sort-value="0.92" | 920 m || 
|-id=548 bgcolor=#fefefe
| 178548 ||  || — || November 4, 1999 || Socorro || LINEAR || — || align=right | 2.5 km || 
|-id=549 bgcolor=#E9E9E9
| 178549 ||  || — || November 4, 1999 || Socorro || LINEAR || — || align=right | 2.2 km || 
|-id=550 bgcolor=#fefefe
| 178550 ||  || — || November 4, 1999 || Socorro || LINEAR || — || align=right | 1.6 km || 
|-id=551 bgcolor=#FA8072
| 178551 ||  || — || November 4, 1999 || Socorro || LINEAR || H || align=right | 1.0 km || 
|-id=552 bgcolor=#fefefe
| 178552 ||  || — || November 5, 1999 || Socorro || LINEAR || FLO || align=right | 1.2 km || 
|-id=553 bgcolor=#fefefe
| 178553 ||  || — || November 9, 1999 || Socorro || LINEAR || — || align=right | 1.0 km || 
|-id=554 bgcolor=#fefefe
| 178554 ||  || — || November 9, 1999 || Socorro || LINEAR || — || align=right | 1.3 km || 
|-id=555 bgcolor=#d6d6d6
| 178555 ||  || — || November 6, 1999 || Kitt Peak || Spacewatch || THM || align=right | 3.9 km || 
|-id=556 bgcolor=#fefefe
| 178556 ||  || — || November 9, 1999 || Kitt Peak || Spacewatch || MAS || align=right | 1.2 km || 
|-id=557 bgcolor=#fefefe
| 178557 ||  || — || November 9, 1999 || Socorro || LINEAR || PHO || align=right | 1.7 km || 
|-id=558 bgcolor=#E9E9E9
| 178558 ||  || — || November 9, 1999 || Socorro || LINEAR || — || align=right | 1.8 km || 
|-id=559 bgcolor=#fefefe
| 178559 ||  || — || November 11, 1999 || Catalina || CSS || — || align=right | 1.2 km || 
|-id=560 bgcolor=#fefefe
| 178560 ||  || — || November 11, 1999 || Catalina || CSS || ERI || align=right | 2.5 km || 
|-id=561 bgcolor=#fefefe
| 178561 ||  || — || November 14, 1999 || Socorro || LINEAR || — || align=right | 1.2 km || 
|-id=562 bgcolor=#E9E9E9
| 178562 ||  || — || November 14, 1999 || Socorro || LINEAR || — || align=right | 1.4 km || 
|-id=563 bgcolor=#fefefe
| 178563 ||  || — || November 14, 1999 || Socorro || LINEAR || MAS || align=right | 1.00 km || 
|-id=564 bgcolor=#fefefe
| 178564 ||  || — || November 9, 1999 || Kitt Peak || Spacewatch || — || align=right | 1.2 km || 
|-id=565 bgcolor=#fefefe
| 178565 ||  || — || November 5, 1999 || Socorro || LINEAR || V || align=right data-sort-value="0.98" | 980 m || 
|-id=566 bgcolor=#fefefe
| 178566 ||  || — || November 9, 1999 || Socorro || LINEAR || — || align=right | 1.6 km || 
|-id=567 bgcolor=#fefefe
| 178567 ||  || — || November 15, 1999 || Socorro || LINEAR || V || align=right | 1.1 km || 
|-id=568 bgcolor=#fefefe
| 178568 ||  || — || November 9, 1999 || Kitt Peak || Spacewatch || NYS || align=right data-sort-value="0.93" | 930 m || 
|-id=569 bgcolor=#fefefe
| 178569 ||  || — || November 14, 1999 || Catalina || CSS || V || align=right | 1.1 km || 
|-id=570 bgcolor=#fefefe
| 178570 ||  || — || November 12, 1999 || Socorro || LINEAR || — || align=right | 1.6 km || 
|-id=571 bgcolor=#E9E9E9
| 178571 ||  || — || November 28, 1999 || Višnjan Observatory || K. Korlević || — || align=right | 1.7 km || 
|-id=572 bgcolor=#d6d6d6
| 178572 ||  || — || November 28, 1999 || Kitt Peak || Spacewatch || — || align=right | 3.6 km || 
|-id=573 bgcolor=#fefefe
| 178573 ||  || — || November 30, 1999 || Kitt Peak || Spacewatch || FLO || align=right data-sort-value="0.91" | 910 m || 
|-id=574 bgcolor=#fefefe
| 178574 ||  || — || November 30, 1999 || Kitt Peak || Spacewatch || NYS || align=right | 1.0 km || 
|-id=575 bgcolor=#fefefe
| 178575 || 1999 XO || — || December 2, 1999 || Kitt Peak || Spacewatch || NYS || align=right data-sort-value="0.82" | 820 m || 
|-id=576 bgcolor=#fefefe
| 178576 ||  || — || December 4, 1999 || Catalina || CSS || NYS || align=right | 1.0 km || 
|-id=577 bgcolor=#fefefe
| 178577 ||  || — || December 6, 1999 || Socorro || LINEAR || NYS || align=right | 1.0 km || 
|-id=578 bgcolor=#E9E9E9
| 178578 ||  || — || December 7, 1999 || Socorro || LINEAR || — || align=right | 1.4 km || 
|-id=579 bgcolor=#fefefe
| 178579 ||  || — || December 7, 1999 || Socorro || LINEAR || — || align=right | 1.1 km || 
|-id=580 bgcolor=#fefefe
| 178580 ||  || — || December 7, 1999 || Socorro || LINEAR || NYS || align=right | 1.2 km || 
|-id=581 bgcolor=#fefefe
| 178581 ||  || — || December 7, 1999 || Socorro || LINEAR || — || align=right | 1.3 km || 
|-id=582 bgcolor=#fefefe
| 178582 ||  || — || December 11, 1999 || Socorro || LINEAR || — || align=right | 3.1 km || 
|-id=583 bgcolor=#E9E9E9
| 178583 ||  || — || December 12, 1999 || Socorro || LINEAR || — || align=right | 1.6 km || 
|-id=584 bgcolor=#fefefe
| 178584 ||  || — || December 10, 1999 || Socorro || LINEAR || — || align=right | 1.5 km || 
|-id=585 bgcolor=#fefefe
| 178585 ||  || — || December 14, 1999 || Socorro || LINEAR || CHL || align=right | 3.1 km || 
|-id=586 bgcolor=#E9E9E9
| 178586 ||  || — || December 15, 1999 || Kitt Peak || Spacewatch || — || align=right | 2.3 km || 
|-id=587 bgcolor=#fefefe
| 178587 ||  || — || December 13, 1999 || Kitt Peak || Spacewatch || — || align=right | 1.1 km || 
|-id=588 bgcolor=#fefefe
| 178588 ||  || — || December 13, 1999 || Kitt Peak || Spacewatch || — || align=right | 1.2 km || 
|-id=589 bgcolor=#fefefe
| 178589 ||  || — || December 17, 1999 || Socorro || LINEAR || H || align=right | 1.2 km || 
|-id=590 bgcolor=#fefefe
| 178590 ||  || — || December 16, 1999 || Kitt Peak || Spacewatch || NYS || align=right data-sort-value="0.82" | 820 m || 
|-id=591 bgcolor=#E9E9E9
| 178591 ||  || — || January 3, 2000 || Socorro || LINEAR || MAR || align=right | 1.8 km || 
|-id=592 bgcolor=#fefefe
| 178592 ||  || — || January 4, 2000 || Socorro || LINEAR || H || align=right | 1.4 km || 
|-id=593 bgcolor=#E9E9E9
| 178593 ||  || — || January 5, 2000 || Socorro || LINEAR || — || align=right | 1.4 km || 
|-id=594 bgcolor=#fefefe
| 178594 ||  || — || January 7, 2000 || Socorro || LINEAR || H || align=right data-sort-value="0.85" | 850 m || 
|-id=595 bgcolor=#fefefe
| 178595 ||  || — || January 3, 2000 || Kitt Peak || Spacewatch || — || align=right | 1.1 km || 
|-id=596 bgcolor=#E9E9E9
| 178596 ||  || — || January 28, 2000 || Socorro || LINEAR || — || align=right | 2.7 km || 
|-id=597 bgcolor=#fefefe
| 178597 ||  || — || January 26, 2000 || Kitt Peak || Spacewatch || MAS || align=right | 1.2 km || 
|-id=598 bgcolor=#fefefe
| 178598 ||  || — || January 31, 2000 || Socorro || LINEAR || — || align=right | 1.2 km || 
|-id=599 bgcolor=#fefefe
| 178599 ||  || — || February 3, 2000 || Socorro || LINEAR || V || align=right | 1.1 km || 
|-id=600 bgcolor=#E9E9E9
| 178600 ||  || — || February 2, 2000 || Socorro || LINEAR || MIT || align=right | 4.8 km || 
|}

178601–178700 

|-bgcolor=#FFC2E0
| 178601 ||  || — || February 5, 2000 || Socorro || LINEAR || AMO +1km || align=right | 1.1 km || 
|-id=602 bgcolor=#E9E9E9
| 178602 ||  || — || February 8, 2000 || Kitt Peak || Spacewatch || — || align=right | 2.6 km || 
|-id=603 bgcolor=#fefefe
| 178603 Pinkine ||  ||  || February 5, 2000 || Kitt Peak || M. W. Buie || NYS || align=right | 1.2 km || 
|-id=604 bgcolor=#fefefe
| 178604 ||  || — || February 5, 2000 || Kitt Peak || Spacewatch || NYS || align=right | 1.6 km || 
|-id=605 bgcolor=#E9E9E9
| 178605 ||  || — || February 29, 2000 || Socorro || LINEAR || — || align=right | 1.5 km || 
|-id=606 bgcolor=#E9E9E9
| 178606 ||  || — || February 29, 2000 || Socorro || LINEAR || — || align=right | 1.1 km || 
|-id=607 bgcolor=#E9E9E9
| 178607 ||  || — || February 29, 2000 || Socorro || LINEAR || — || align=right | 3.7 km || 
|-id=608 bgcolor=#E9E9E9
| 178608 ||  || — || February 29, 2000 || Socorro || LINEAR || — || align=right | 3.4 km || 
|-id=609 bgcolor=#fefefe
| 178609 ||  || — || February 28, 2000 || Socorro || LINEAR || — || align=right | 1.8 km || 
|-id=610 bgcolor=#fefefe
| 178610 ||  || — || March 2, 2000 || Kitt Peak || Spacewatch || H || align=right data-sort-value="0.76" | 760 m || 
|-id=611 bgcolor=#fefefe
| 178611 ||  || — || March 5, 2000 || Socorro || LINEAR || H || align=right data-sort-value="0.79" | 790 m || 
|-id=612 bgcolor=#fefefe
| 178612 ||  || — || March 11, 2000 || Kitt Peak || Spacewatch || — || align=right | 1.2 km || 
|-id=613 bgcolor=#E9E9E9
| 178613 ||  || — || March 5, 2000 || Socorro || LINEAR || — || align=right | 1.1 km || 
|-id=614 bgcolor=#E9E9E9
| 178614 ||  || — || March 10, 2000 || Kitt Peak || Spacewatch || — || align=right | 1.3 km || 
|-id=615 bgcolor=#E9E9E9
| 178615 ||  || — || March 11, 2000 || Anderson Mesa || LONEOS || — || align=right | 1.7 km || 
|-id=616 bgcolor=#E9E9E9
| 178616 ||  || — || March 2, 2000 || Kitt Peak || Spacewatch || — || align=right | 1.3 km || 
|-id=617 bgcolor=#E9E9E9
| 178617 ||  || — || March 6, 2000 || Haleakala || NEAT || — || align=right | 1.5 km || 
|-id=618 bgcolor=#fefefe
| 178618 ||  || — || March 4, 2000 || Socorro || LINEAR || H || align=right data-sort-value="0.82" | 820 m || 
|-id=619 bgcolor=#fefefe
| 178619 || 2000 FT || — || March 26, 2000 || Socorro || LINEAR || H || align=right data-sort-value="0.79" | 790 m || 
|-id=620 bgcolor=#fefefe
| 178620 ||  || — || March 29, 2000 || Socorro || LINEAR || H || align=right | 1.4 km || 
|-id=621 bgcolor=#E9E9E9
| 178621 ||  || — || March 29, 2000 || Socorro || LINEAR || — || align=right | 1.3 km || 
|-id=622 bgcolor=#E9E9E9
| 178622 ||  || — || March 29, 2000 || Socorro || LINEAR || HNA || align=right | 3.9 km || 
|-id=623 bgcolor=#E9E9E9
| 178623 ||  || — || March 27, 2000 || Kitt Peak || Spacewatch || — || align=right | 1.2 km || 
|-id=624 bgcolor=#E9E9E9
| 178624 ||  || — || March 29, 2000 || Kitt Peak || Spacewatch || — || align=right | 2.2 km || 
|-id=625 bgcolor=#E9E9E9
| 178625 ||  || — || April 5, 2000 || Socorro || LINEAR || — || align=right | 4.5 km || 
|-id=626 bgcolor=#E9E9E9
| 178626 ||  || — || April 5, 2000 || Socorro || LINEAR || — || align=right | 1.6 km || 
|-id=627 bgcolor=#fefefe
| 178627 ||  || — || April 7, 2000 || Socorro || LINEAR || H || align=right data-sort-value="0.98" | 980 m || 
|-id=628 bgcolor=#E9E9E9
| 178628 ||  || — || April 8, 2000 || Socorro || LINEAR || — || align=right | 1.6 km || 
|-id=629 bgcolor=#E9E9E9
| 178629 ||  || — || April 7, 2000 || Anderson Mesa || LONEOS || EUN || align=right | 1.9 km || 
|-id=630 bgcolor=#E9E9E9
| 178630 ||  || — || April 6, 2000 || Anderson Mesa || LONEOS || — || align=right | 1.5 km || 
|-id=631 bgcolor=#E9E9E9
| 178631 ||  || — || April 28, 2000 || Socorro || LINEAR || — || align=right | 2.5 km || 
|-id=632 bgcolor=#E9E9E9
| 178632 ||  || — || April 29, 2000 || Socorro || LINEAR || — || align=right | 1.7 km || 
|-id=633 bgcolor=#E9E9E9
| 178633 ||  || — || April 29, 2000 || Socorro || LINEAR || — || align=right | 2.1 km || 
|-id=634 bgcolor=#fefefe
| 178634 ||  || — || April 29, 2000 || Anderson Mesa || LONEOS || H || align=right | 1.0 km || 
|-id=635 bgcolor=#E9E9E9
| 178635 ||  || — || April 29, 2000 || Socorro || LINEAR || — || align=right | 2.7 km || 
|-id=636 bgcolor=#fefefe
| 178636 ||  || — || May 2, 2000 || Socorro || LINEAR || H || align=right | 1.6 km || 
|-id=637 bgcolor=#E9E9E9
| 178637 ||  || — || May 4, 2000 || Socorro || LINEAR || — || align=right | 1.4 km || 
|-id=638 bgcolor=#E9E9E9
| 178638 ||  || — || May 6, 2000 || Socorro || LINEAR || — || align=right | 1.5 km || 
|-id=639 bgcolor=#E9E9E9
| 178639 ||  || — || May 7, 2000 || Socorro || LINEAR || JUN || align=right | 1.6 km || 
|-id=640 bgcolor=#E9E9E9
| 178640 ||  || — || May 9, 2000 || Socorro || LINEAR || — || align=right | 1.7 km || 
|-id=641 bgcolor=#E9E9E9
| 178641 ||  || — || May 2, 2000 || Anderson Mesa || LONEOS || JUN || align=right | 1.9 km || 
|-id=642 bgcolor=#E9E9E9
| 178642 ||  || — || May 1, 2000 || Anderson Mesa || LONEOS || — || align=right | 4.1 km || 
|-id=643 bgcolor=#E9E9E9
| 178643 ||  || — || May 2, 2000 || Anderson Mesa || LONEOS || EUN || align=right | 2.0 km || 
|-id=644 bgcolor=#E9E9E9
| 178644 ||  || — || May 28, 2000 || Socorro || LINEAR || — || align=right | 1.7 km || 
|-id=645 bgcolor=#E9E9E9
| 178645 ||  || — || May 28, 2000 || Socorro || LINEAR || — || align=right | 3.0 km || 
|-id=646 bgcolor=#E9E9E9
| 178646 ||  || — || May 25, 2000 || Kitt Peak || Spacewatch || — || align=right | 2.2 km || 
|-id=647 bgcolor=#E9E9E9
| 178647 ||  || — || May 26, 2000 || Kitt Peak || Spacewatch || — || align=right | 1.3 km || 
|-id=648 bgcolor=#E9E9E9
| 178648 ||  || — || May 27, 2000 || Anderson Mesa || LONEOS || — || align=right | 3.3 km || 
|-id=649 bgcolor=#E9E9E9
| 178649 ||  || — || May 27, 2000 || Anderson Mesa || LONEOS || GER || align=right | 3.3 km || 
|-id=650 bgcolor=#E9E9E9
| 178650 ||  || — || June 4, 2000 || Socorro || LINEAR || — || align=right | 2.0 km || 
|-id=651 bgcolor=#E9E9E9
| 178651 ||  || — || July 5, 2000 || Kitt Peak || Spacewatch || — || align=right | 4.4 km || 
|-id=652 bgcolor=#E9E9E9
| 178652 ||  || — || July 4, 2000 || Kitt Peak || Spacewatch || — || align=right | 4.5 km || 
|-id=653 bgcolor=#E9E9E9
| 178653 ||  || — || July 30, 2000 || Socorro || LINEAR || — || align=right | 3.8 km || 
|-id=654 bgcolor=#d6d6d6
| 178654 ||  || — || July 23, 2000 || Socorro || LINEAR || — || align=right | 5.2 km || 
|-id=655 bgcolor=#E9E9E9
| 178655 ||  || — || August 1, 2000 || Socorro || LINEAR || — || align=right | 4.4 km || 
|-id=656 bgcolor=#d6d6d6
| 178656 ||  || — || August 24, 2000 || Socorro || LINEAR || EOS || align=right | 3.7 km || 
|-id=657 bgcolor=#d6d6d6
| 178657 ||  || — || August 24, 2000 || Socorro || LINEAR || — || align=right | 3.5 km || 
|-id=658 bgcolor=#E9E9E9
| 178658 ||  || — || August 28, 2000 || Socorro || LINEAR || — || align=right | 4.9 km || 
|-id=659 bgcolor=#E9E9E9
| 178659 ||  || — || August 24, 2000 || Socorro || LINEAR || — || align=right | 4.4 km || 
|-id=660 bgcolor=#E9E9E9
| 178660 ||  || — || August 26, 2000 || Socorro || LINEAR || — || align=right | 2.7 km || 
|-id=661 bgcolor=#E9E9E9
| 178661 ||  || — || August 28, 2000 || Socorro || LINEAR || — || align=right | 3.6 km || 
|-id=662 bgcolor=#E9E9E9
| 178662 ||  || — || August 24, 2000 || Socorro || LINEAR || POS || align=right | 5.4 km || 
|-id=663 bgcolor=#d6d6d6
| 178663 ||  || — || August 25, 2000 || Socorro || LINEAR || — || align=right | 4.0 km || 
|-id=664 bgcolor=#d6d6d6
| 178664 ||  || — || August 28, 2000 || Socorro || LINEAR || — || align=right | 2.5 km || 
|-id=665 bgcolor=#d6d6d6
| 178665 ||  || — || August 28, 2000 || Socorro || LINEAR || THB || align=right | 5.5 km || 
|-id=666 bgcolor=#d6d6d6
| 178666 ||  || — || August 26, 2000 || Socorro || LINEAR || — || align=right | 4.6 km || 
|-id=667 bgcolor=#d6d6d6
| 178667 ||  || — || August 31, 2000 || Socorro || LINEAR || URS || align=right | 6.5 km || 
|-id=668 bgcolor=#d6d6d6
| 178668 ||  || — || August 27, 2000 || Kvistaberg || UDAS || — || align=right | 3.3 km || 
|-id=669 bgcolor=#d6d6d6
| 178669 ||  || — || August 24, 2000 || Socorro || LINEAR || — || align=right | 3.6 km || 
|-id=670 bgcolor=#E9E9E9
| 178670 ||  || — || August 31, 2000 || Socorro || LINEAR || — || align=right | 4.8 km || 
|-id=671 bgcolor=#E9E9E9
| 178671 ||  || — || August 31, 2000 || Socorro || LINEAR || — || align=right | 3.4 km || 
|-id=672 bgcolor=#d6d6d6
| 178672 ||  || — || August 31, 2000 || Socorro || LINEAR || EUP || align=right | 6.3 km || 
|-id=673 bgcolor=#E9E9E9
| 178673 ||  || — || August 26, 2000 || Socorro || LINEAR || CLO || align=right | 3.5 km || 
|-id=674 bgcolor=#E9E9E9
| 178674 ||  || — || August 26, 2000 || Socorro || LINEAR || INO || align=right | 1.8 km || 
|-id=675 bgcolor=#d6d6d6
| 178675 ||  || — || August 29, 2000 || Socorro || LINEAR || — || align=right | 3.2 km || 
|-id=676 bgcolor=#E9E9E9
| 178676 ||  || — || August 21, 2000 || Anderson Mesa || LONEOS || POS || align=right | 4.2 km || 
|-id=677 bgcolor=#E9E9E9
| 178677 ||  || — || August 31, 2000 || Socorro || LINEAR || — || align=right | 2.9 km || 
|-id=678 bgcolor=#d6d6d6
| 178678 ||  || — || August 29, 2000 || Socorro || LINEAR || EOS || align=right | 3.2 km || 
|-id=679 bgcolor=#d6d6d6
| 178679 Piquette ||  ||  || August 28, 2000 || Cerro Tololo || M. W. Buie || THM || align=right | 2.2 km || 
|-id=680 bgcolor=#d6d6d6
| 178680 ||  || — || September 2, 2000 || Loomberah || G. J. Garradd || EOS || align=right | 2.8 km || 
|-id=681 bgcolor=#d6d6d6
| 178681 ||  || — || September 1, 2000 || Socorro || LINEAR || — || align=right | 4.6 km || 
|-id=682 bgcolor=#d6d6d6
| 178682 ||  || — || September 1, 2000 || Socorro || LINEAR || — || align=right | 5.1 km || 
|-id=683 bgcolor=#d6d6d6
| 178683 ||  || — || September 2, 2000 || Anderson Mesa || LONEOS || — || align=right | 5.9 km || 
|-id=684 bgcolor=#d6d6d6
| 178684 ||  || — || September 2, 2000 || Anderson Mesa || LONEOS || — || align=right | 4.4 km || 
|-id=685 bgcolor=#d6d6d6
| 178685 ||  || — || September 4, 2000 || Kitt Peak || Spacewatch || — || align=right | 3.6 km || 
|-id=686 bgcolor=#d6d6d6
| 178686 ||  || — || September 24, 2000 || Prescott || P. G. Comba || — || align=right | 5.6 km || 
|-id=687 bgcolor=#d6d6d6
| 178687 ||  || — || September 23, 2000 || Socorro || LINEAR || EOS || align=right | 3.4 km || 
|-id=688 bgcolor=#d6d6d6
| 178688 ||  || — || September 23, 2000 || Socorro || LINEAR || EOS || align=right | 3.7 km || 
|-id=689 bgcolor=#d6d6d6
| 178689 ||  || — || September 23, 2000 || Socorro || LINEAR || — || align=right | 5.7 km || 
|-id=690 bgcolor=#d6d6d6
| 178690 ||  || — || September 23, 2000 || Socorro || LINEAR || — || align=right | 4.7 km || 
|-id=691 bgcolor=#d6d6d6
| 178691 ||  || — || September 23, 2000 || Socorro || LINEAR || NAE || align=right | 5.8 km || 
|-id=692 bgcolor=#d6d6d6
| 178692 ||  || — || September 23, 2000 || Socorro || LINEAR || MEL || align=right | 7.4 km || 
|-id=693 bgcolor=#d6d6d6
| 178693 ||  || — || September 24, 2000 || Socorro || LINEAR || — || align=right | 4.7 km || 
|-id=694 bgcolor=#d6d6d6
| 178694 ||  || — || September 24, 2000 || Socorro || LINEAR || — || align=right | 4.6 km || 
|-id=695 bgcolor=#d6d6d6
| 178695 ||  || — || September 24, 2000 || Socorro || LINEAR || — || align=right | 3.1 km || 
|-id=696 bgcolor=#d6d6d6
| 178696 ||  || — || September 24, 2000 || Socorro || LINEAR || — || align=right | 3.6 km || 
|-id=697 bgcolor=#d6d6d6
| 178697 ||  || — || September 24, 2000 || Socorro || LINEAR || KOR || align=right | 2.8 km || 
|-id=698 bgcolor=#d6d6d6
| 178698 ||  || — || September 24, 2000 || Socorro || LINEAR || KOR || align=right | 2.8 km || 
|-id=699 bgcolor=#d6d6d6
| 178699 ||  || — || September 24, 2000 || Socorro || LINEAR || THB || align=right | 3.9 km || 
|-id=700 bgcolor=#d6d6d6
| 178700 ||  || — || September 24, 2000 || Socorro || LINEAR || NAE || align=right | 5.6 km || 
|}

178701–178800 

|-bgcolor=#d6d6d6
| 178701 ||  || — || September 23, 2000 || Socorro || LINEAR || URS || align=right | 6.0 km || 
|-id=702 bgcolor=#d6d6d6
| 178702 ||  || — || September 23, 2000 || Socorro || LINEAR || TIR || align=right | 4.8 km || 
|-id=703 bgcolor=#d6d6d6
| 178703 ||  || — || September 24, 2000 || Socorro || LINEAR || — || align=right | 4.6 km || 
|-id=704 bgcolor=#d6d6d6
| 178704 ||  || — || September 23, 2000 || Socorro || LINEAR || — || align=right | 5.7 km || 
|-id=705 bgcolor=#d6d6d6
| 178705 ||  || — || September 24, 2000 || Socorro || LINEAR || — || align=right | 5.4 km || 
|-id=706 bgcolor=#d6d6d6
| 178706 ||  || — || September 23, 2000 || Socorro || LINEAR || — || align=right | 4.7 km || 
|-id=707 bgcolor=#d6d6d6
| 178707 ||  || — || September 20, 2000 || Haleakala || NEAT || — || align=right | 3.8 km || 
|-id=708 bgcolor=#d6d6d6
| 178708 ||  || — || September 24, 2000 || Socorro || LINEAR || EOS || align=right | 3.0 km || 
|-id=709 bgcolor=#d6d6d6
| 178709 ||  || — || September 24, 2000 || Socorro || LINEAR || EOS || align=right | 2.7 km || 
|-id=710 bgcolor=#d6d6d6
| 178710 ||  || — || September 24, 2000 || Socorro || LINEAR || — || align=right | 5.2 km || 
|-id=711 bgcolor=#d6d6d6
| 178711 ||  || — || September 25, 2000 || Socorro || LINEAR || — || align=right | 5.5 km || 
|-id=712 bgcolor=#d6d6d6
| 178712 ||  || — || September 26, 2000 || Socorro || LINEAR || — || align=right | 5.1 km || 
|-id=713 bgcolor=#d6d6d6
| 178713 ||  || — || September 28, 2000 || Socorro || LINEAR || — || align=right | 3.7 km || 
|-id=714 bgcolor=#E9E9E9
| 178714 ||  || — || September 24, 2000 || Socorro || LINEAR || DOR || align=right | 3.5 km || 
|-id=715 bgcolor=#d6d6d6
| 178715 ||  || — || September 24, 2000 || Socorro || LINEAR || EOS || align=right | 2.8 km || 
|-id=716 bgcolor=#d6d6d6
| 178716 ||  || — || September 24, 2000 || Socorro || LINEAR || — || align=right | 2.7 km || 
|-id=717 bgcolor=#d6d6d6
| 178717 ||  || — || September 24, 2000 || Socorro || LINEAR || — || align=right | 8.2 km || 
|-id=718 bgcolor=#d6d6d6
| 178718 ||  || — || September 24, 2000 || Socorro || LINEAR || — || align=right | 4.1 km || 
|-id=719 bgcolor=#d6d6d6
| 178719 ||  || — || September 25, 2000 || Socorro || LINEAR || — || align=right | 3.8 km || 
|-id=720 bgcolor=#d6d6d6
| 178720 ||  || — || September 25, 2000 || Socorro || LINEAR || — || align=right | 5.2 km || 
|-id=721 bgcolor=#fefefe
| 178721 ||  || — || September 26, 2000 || Socorro || LINEAR || — || align=right | 1.1 km || 
|-id=722 bgcolor=#d6d6d6
| 178722 ||  || — || September 27, 2000 || Socorro || LINEAR || EUP || align=right | 8.6 km || 
|-id=723 bgcolor=#d6d6d6
| 178723 ||  || — || September 28, 2000 || Socorro || LINEAR || EOS || align=right | 3.1 km || 
|-id=724 bgcolor=#d6d6d6
| 178724 ||  || — || September 28, 2000 || Socorro || LINEAR || — || align=right | 4.5 km || 
|-id=725 bgcolor=#d6d6d6
| 178725 ||  || — || September 28, 2000 || Socorro || LINEAR || — || align=right | 4.6 km || 
|-id=726 bgcolor=#d6d6d6
| 178726 ||  || — || September 28, 2000 || Socorro || LINEAR || — || align=right | 4.7 km || 
|-id=727 bgcolor=#d6d6d6
| 178727 ||  || — || September 28, 2000 || Socorro || LINEAR || — || align=right | 4.7 km || 
|-id=728 bgcolor=#d6d6d6
| 178728 ||  || — || September 30, 2000 || Socorro || LINEAR || — || align=right | 3.6 km || 
|-id=729 bgcolor=#d6d6d6
| 178729 ||  || — || September 27, 2000 || Socorro || LINEAR || EUP || align=right | 7.6 km || 
|-id=730 bgcolor=#d6d6d6
| 178730 ||  || — || September 28, 2000 || Kitt Peak || Spacewatch || — || align=right | 5.9 km || 
|-id=731 bgcolor=#E9E9E9
| 178731 ||  || — || September 24, 2000 || Socorro || LINEAR || — || align=right | 3.7 km || 
|-id=732 bgcolor=#E9E9E9
| 178732 ||  || — || September 29, 2000 || Anderson Mesa || LONEOS || — || align=right | 5.1 km || 
|-id=733 bgcolor=#d6d6d6
| 178733 ||  || — || September 26, 2000 || Anderson Mesa || LONEOS || — || align=right | 3.0 km || 
|-id=734 bgcolor=#d6d6d6
| 178734 ||  || — || October 3, 2000 || Bisei SG Center || BATTeRS || LIX || align=right | 6.0 km || 
|-id=735 bgcolor=#d6d6d6
| 178735 ||  || — || October 1, 2000 || Socorro || LINEAR || THM || align=right | 3.4 km || 
|-id=736 bgcolor=#d6d6d6
| 178736 ||  || — || October 1, 2000 || Socorro || LINEAR || EOS || align=right | 3.4 km || 
|-id=737 bgcolor=#d6d6d6
| 178737 ||  || — || October 1, 2000 || Socorro || LINEAR || — || align=right | 4.2 km || 
|-id=738 bgcolor=#d6d6d6
| 178738 ||  || — || October 3, 2000 || Socorro || LINEAR || TIR || align=right | 6.8 km || 
|-id=739 bgcolor=#d6d6d6
| 178739 ||  || — || October 1, 2000 || Socorro || LINEAR || — || align=right | 5.1 km || 
|-id=740 bgcolor=#d6d6d6
| 178740 ||  || — || October 1, 2000 || Anderson Mesa || LONEOS || EOS || align=right | 3.1 km || 
|-id=741 bgcolor=#E9E9E9
| 178741 ||  || — || October 1, 2000 || Anderson Mesa || LONEOS || — || align=right | 2.2 km || 
|-id=742 bgcolor=#d6d6d6
| 178742 ||  || — || October 1, 2000 || Socorro || LINEAR || EOS || align=right | 3.9 km || 
|-id=743 bgcolor=#d6d6d6
| 178743 ||  || — || October 1, 2000 || Socorro || LINEAR || THM || align=right | 3.6 km || 
|-id=744 bgcolor=#d6d6d6
| 178744 ||  || — || October 30, 2000 || Kitt Peak || Spacewatch || EOS || align=right | 3.1 km || 
|-id=745 bgcolor=#d6d6d6
| 178745 ||  || — || October 24, 2000 || Socorro || LINEAR || VER || align=right | 6.2 km || 
|-id=746 bgcolor=#d6d6d6
| 178746 ||  || — || October 24, 2000 || Socorro || LINEAR || URS || align=right | 4.2 km || 
|-id=747 bgcolor=#d6d6d6
| 178747 ||  || — || October 25, 2000 || Socorro || LINEAR || EOS || align=right | 3.5 km || 
|-id=748 bgcolor=#d6d6d6
| 178748 ||  || — || October 30, 2000 || Socorro || LINEAR || HYG || align=right | 3.8 km || 
|-id=749 bgcolor=#d6d6d6
| 178749 ||  || — || October 31, 2000 || Socorro || LINEAR || EOS || align=right | 4.1 km || 
|-id=750 bgcolor=#d6d6d6
| 178750 ||  || — || October 25, 2000 || Socorro || LINEAR || EOS || align=right | 3.7 km || 
|-id=751 bgcolor=#d6d6d6
| 178751 ||  || — || October 19, 2000 || Kitt Peak || Spacewatch || — || align=right | 3.2 km || 
|-id=752 bgcolor=#d6d6d6
| 178752 ||  || — || November 1, 2000 || Ondřejov || P. Pravec || EUP || align=right | 7.8 km || 
|-id=753 bgcolor=#fefefe
| 178753 ||  || — || November 1, 2000 || Socorro || LINEAR || FLO || align=right | 1.0 km || 
|-id=754 bgcolor=#d6d6d6
| 178754 ||  || — || November 1, 2000 || Socorro || LINEAR || EOS || align=right | 3.7 km || 
|-id=755 bgcolor=#d6d6d6
| 178755 ||  || — || November 1, 2000 || Socorro || LINEAR || HYG || align=right | 4.3 km || 
|-id=756 bgcolor=#d6d6d6
| 178756 ||  || — || November 1, 2000 || Socorro || LINEAR || EOS || align=right | 4.3 km || 
|-id=757 bgcolor=#d6d6d6
| 178757 ||  || — || November 1, 2000 || Socorro || LINEAR || — || align=right | 3.9 km || 
|-id=758 bgcolor=#FA8072
| 178758 ||  || — || November 1, 2000 || Socorro || LINEAR || — || align=right | 1.1 km || 
|-id=759 bgcolor=#d6d6d6
| 178759 ||  || — || November 3, 2000 || Socorro || LINEAR || CRO || align=right | 4.6 km || 
|-id=760 bgcolor=#d6d6d6
| 178760 ||  || — || November 1, 2000 || Socorro || LINEAR || — || align=right | 4.0 km || 
|-id=761 bgcolor=#d6d6d6
| 178761 ||  || — || November 19, 2000 || Socorro || LINEAR || — || align=right | 5.2 km || 
|-id=762 bgcolor=#d6d6d6
| 178762 ||  || — || November 19, 2000 || Socorro || LINEAR || — || align=right | 4.3 km || 
|-id=763 bgcolor=#fefefe
| 178763 ||  || — || November 19, 2000 || Socorro || LINEAR || V || align=right data-sort-value="0.96" | 960 m || 
|-id=764 bgcolor=#d6d6d6
| 178764 ||  || — || November 20, 2000 || Socorro || LINEAR || HYG || align=right | 5.4 km || 
|-id=765 bgcolor=#fefefe
| 178765 ||  || — || November 20, 2000 || Socorro || LINEAR || — || align=right | 1.1 km || 
|-id=766 bgcolor=#fefefe
| 178766 ||  || — || November 21, 2000 || Socorro || LINEAR || — || align=right | 1.2 km || 
|-id=767 bgcolor=#d6d6d6
| 178767 ||  || — || November 21, 2000 || Socorro || LINEAR || — || align=right | 4.0 km || 
|-id=768 bgcolor=#d6d6d6
| 178768 ||  || — || November 27, 2000 || Kitt Peak || Spacewatch || HYG || align=right | 5.9 km || 
|-id=769 bgcolor=#fefefe
| 178769 ||  || — || November 21, 2000 || Socorro || LINEAR || — || align=right | 1.2 km || 
|-id=770 bgcolor=#d6d6d6
| 178770 ||  || — || November 20, 2000 || Socorro || LINEAR || VER || align=right | 6.2 km || 
|-id=771 bgcolor=#d6d6d6
| 178771 ||  || — || November 19, 2000 || Anderson Mesa || LONEOS || — || align=right | 5.1 km || 
|-id=772 bgcolor=#d6d6d6
| 178772 ||  || — || November 18, 2000 || Anderson Mesa || LONEOS || EOS || align=right | 3.7 km || 
|-id=773 bgcolor=#fefefe
| 178773 ||  || — || December 23, 2000 || Socorro || LINEAR || — || align=right | 1.2 km || 
|-id=774 bgcolor=#fefefe
| 178774 ||  || — || December 30, 2000 || Socorro || LINEAR || FLO || align=right | 1.1 km || 
|-id=775 bgcolor=#fefefe
| 178775 ||  || — || December 30, 2000 || Socorro || LINEAR || — || align=right | 1.1 km || 
|-id=776 bgcolor=#fefefe
| 178776 ||  || — || December 30, 2000 || Socorro || LINEAR || — || align=right | 1.3 km || 
|-id=777 bgcolor=#d6d6d6
| 178777 ||  || — || December 30, 2000 || Socorro || LINEAR || — || align=right | 4.5 km || 
|-id=778 bgcolor=#fefefe
| 178778 ||  || — || December 31, 2000 || Anderson Mesa || LONEOS || PHO || align=right | 1.7 km || 
|-id=779 bgcolor=#fefefe
| 178779 ||  || — || January 2, 2001 || Socorro || LINEAR || — || align=right | 1.8 km || 
|-id=780 bgcolor=#fefefe
| 178780 ||  || — || January 4, 2001 || Socorro || LINEAR || — || align=right | 1.6 km || 
|-id=781 bgcolor=#fefefe
| 178781 ||  || — || January 4, 2001 || Socorro || LINEAR || — || align=right data-sort-value="0.94" | 940 m || 
|-id=782 bgcolor=#fefefe
| 178782 ||  || — || January 15, 2001 || Socorro || LINEAR || PHO || align=right | 1.7 km || 
|-id=783 bgcolor=#FA8072
| 178783 ||  || — || January 18, 2001 || Socorro || LINEAR || — || align=right | 1.9 km || 
|-id=784 bgcolor=#fefefe
| 178784 ||  || — || January 18, 2001 || Socorro || LINEAR || — || align=right | 1.4 km || 
|-id=785 bgcolor=#fefefe
| 178785 ||  || — || January 21, 2001 || Socorro || LINEAR || FLO || align=right data-sort-value="0.88" | 880 m || 
|-id=786 bgcolor=#fefefe
| 178786 ||  || — || February 1, 2001 || Anderson Mesa || LONEOS || — || align=right | 1.2 km || 
|-id=787 bgcolor=#E9E9E9
| 178787 ||  || — || February 15, 2001 || Socorro || LINEAR || — || align=right | 5.5 km || 
|-id=788 bgcolor=#fefefe
| 178788 ||  || — || February 3, 2001 || Kitt Peak || Spacewatch || — || align=right | 1.6 km || 
|-id=789 bgcolor=#fefefe
| 178789 || 2001 DE || — || February 16, 2001 || Črni Vrh || Črni Vrh || — || align=right | 1.5 km || 
|-id=790 bgcolor=#fefefe
| 178790 ||  || — || February 16, 2001 || Kitt Peak || Spacewatch || — || align=right | 1.0 km || 
|-id=791 bgcolor=#fefefe
| 178791 ||  || — || February 16, 2001 || Socorro || LINEAR || — || align=right | 1.1 km || 
|-id=792 bgcolor=#fefefe
| 178792 ||  || — || February 19, 2001 || Socorro || LINEAR || PHO || align=right | 1.4 km || 
|-id=793 bgcolor=#fefefe
| 178793 ||  || — || February 17, 2001 || Socorro || LINEAR || — || align=right data-sort-value="0.98" | 980 m || 
|-id=794 bgcolor=#fefefe
| 178794 ||  || — || February 19, 2001 || Socorro || LINEAR || — || align=right | 1.5 km || 
|-id=795 bgcolor=#fefefe
| 178795 ||  || — || February 19, 2001 || Socorro || LINEAR || — || align=right | 1.1 km || 
|-id=796 bgcolor=#fefefe
| 178796 Posztoczky ||  ||  || February 27, 2001 || Piszkéstető || K. Sárneczky, A. Derekas || ERI || align=right | 1.8 km || 
|-id=797 bgcolor=#fefefe
| 178797 ||  || — || February 19, 2001 || Anderson Mesa || LONEOS || — || align=right | 1.2 km || 
|-id=798 bgcolor=#fefefe
| 178798 ||  || — || March 3, 2001 || Kitt Peak || Spacewatch || V || align=right data-sort-value="0.82" | 820 m || 
|-id=799 bgcolor=#fefefe
| 178799 ||  || — || March 2, 2001 || Anderson Mesa || LONEOS || — || align=right | 1.1 km || 
|-id=800 bgcolor=#fefefe
| 178800 ||  || — || March 2, 2001 || Anderson Mesa || LONEOS || — || align=right | 1.4 km || 
|}

178801–178900 

|-bgcolor=#fefefe
| 178801 ||  || — || March 15, 2001 || Haleakala || NEAT || NYS || align=right | 1.0 km || 
|-id=802 bgcolor=#fefefe
| 178802 || 2001 FN || — || March 16, 2001 || Socorro || LINEAR || FLO || align=right | 1.0 km || 
|-id=803 bgcolor=#fefefe
| 178803 Kristenjohnson ||  ||  || March 19, 2001 || Junk Bond || D. Healy || MAS || align=right data-sort-value="0.75" | 750 m || 
|-id=804 bgcolor=#fefefe
| 178804 ||  || — || March 22, 2001 || Kitt Peak || Spacewatch || — || align=right | 1.1 km || 
|-id=805 bgcolor=#FA8072
| 178805 ||  || — || March 18, 2001 || Socorro || LINEAR || — || align=right | 1.3 km || 
|-id=806 bgcolor=#fefefe
| 178806 ||  || — || March 19, 2001 || Socorro || LINEAR || — || align=right | 1.3 km || 
|-id=807 bgcolor=#fefefe
| 178807 ||  || — || March 19, 2001 || Socorro || LINEAR || — || align=right | 1.2 km || 
|-id=808 bgcolor=#fefefe
| 178808 ||  || — || March 19, 2001 || Socorro || LINEAR || — || align=right | 1.5 km || 
|-id=809 bgcolor=#fefefe
| 178809 ||  || — || March 19, 2001 || Socorro || LINEAR || FLO || align=right | 1.7 km || 
|-id=810 bgcolor=#fefefe
| 178810 ||  || — || March 19, 2001 || Socorro || LINEAR || — || align=right | 1.2 km || 
|-id=811 bgcolor=#fefefe
| 178811 ||  || — || March 23, 2001 || Socorro || LINEAR || — || align=right | 1.5 km || 
|-id=812 bgcolor=#fefefe
| 178812 ||  || — || March 27, 2001 || Kitt Peak || Spacewatch || V || align=right data-sort-value="0.88" | 880 m || 
|-id=813 bgcolor=#fefefe
| 178813 ||  || — || March 27, 2001 || Kitt Peak || Spacewatch || — || align=right data-sort-value="0.91" | 910 m || 
|-id=814 bgcolor=#fefefe
| 178814 ||  || — || March 16, 2001 || Socorro || LINEAR || FLO || align=right | 1.3 km || 
|-id=815 bgcolor=#fefefe
| 178815 ||  || — || March 18, 2001 || Socorro || LINEAR || — || align=right | 1.5 km || 
|-id=816 bgcolor=#fefefe
| 178816 ||  || — || March 19, 2001 || Anderson Mesa || LONEOS || V || align=right | 1.2 km || 
|-id=817 bgcolor=#fefefe
| 178817 ||  || — || March 26, 2001 || Socorro || LINEAR || — || align=right | 3.8 km || 
|-id=818 bgcolor=#fefefe
| 178818 ||  || — || March 23, 2001 || Anderson Mesa || LONEOS || — || align=right | 1.2 km || 
|-id=819 bgcolor=#fefefe
| 178819 ||  || — || March 26, 2001 || Haleakala || NEAT || NYS || align=right data-sort-value="0.87" | 870 m || 
|-id=820 bgcolor=#fefefe
| 178820 ||  || — || March 27, 2001 || Haleakala || NEAT || FLO || align=right | 2.3 km || 
|-id=821 bgcolor=#fefefe
| 178821 ||  || — || March 30, 2001 || Kitt Peak || Spacewatch || — || align=right | 1.4 km || 
|-id=822 bgcolor=#fefefe
| 178822 ||  || — || March 18, 2001 || Haleakala || NEAT || — || align=right | 1.3 km || 
|-id=823 bgcolor=#fefefe
| 178823 ||  || — || March 16, 2001 || Socorro || LINEAR || — || align=right | 1.6 km || 
|-id=824 bgcolor=#fefefe
| 178824 ||  || — || March 16, 2001 || Socorro || LINEAR || — || align=right | 3.4 km || 
|-id=825 bgcolor=#fefefe
| 178825 ||  || — || April 13, 2001 || Socorro || LINEAR || PHO || align=right | 1.7 km || 
|-id=826 bgcolor=#fefefe
| 178826 ||  || — || April 15, 2001 || Socorro || LINEAR || — || align=right | 2.6 km || 
|-id=827 bgcolor=#fefefe
| 178827 ||  || — || April 15, 2001 || Socorro || LINEAR || — || align=right | 1.4 km || 
|-id=828 bgcolor=#fefefe
| 178828 ||  || — || April 15, 2001 || Socorro || LINEAR || — || align=right | 1.4 km || 
|-id=829 bgcolor=#fefefe
| 178829 ||  || — || April 15, 2001 || Haleakala || NEAT || NYS || align=right data-sort-value="0.91" | 910 m || 
|-id=830 bgcolor=#fefefe
| 178830 Anne-Véronique || 2001 HT ||  || April 18, 2001 || Saint-Véran || Saint-Véran Obs. || MAS || align=right data-sort-value="0.87" | 870 m || 
|-id=831 bgcolor=#fefefe
| 178831 ||  || — || April 17, 2001 || Socorro || LINEAR || — || align=right | 1.8 km || 
|-id=832 bgcolor=#fefefe
| 178832 ||  || — || April 17, 2001 || Socorro || LINEAR || ERI || align=right | 2.4 km || 
|-id=833 bgcolor=#FA8072
| 178833 ||  || — || April 18, 2001 || Socorro || LINEAR || — || align=right | 2.1 km || 
|-id=834 bgcolor=#fefefe
| 178834 ||  || — || April 24, 2001 || Ondřejov || P. Kušnirák, P. Pravec || V || align=right | 1.1 km || 
|-id=835 bgcolor=#fefefe
| 178835 ||  || — || April 24, 2001 || Kitt Peak || Spacewatch || — || align=right | 1.3 km || 
|-id=836 bgcolor=#fefefe
| 178836 ||  || — || April 24, 2001 || Kitt Peak || Spacewatch || NYS || align=right data-sort-value="0.99" | 990 m || 
|-id=837 bgcolor=#fefefe
| 178837 ||  || — || April 21, 2001 || Socorro || LINEAR || — || align=right | 1.8 km || 
|-id=838 bgcolor=#fefefe
| 178838 ||  || — || April 23, 2001 || Socorro || LINEAR || NYS || align=right | 1.1 km || 
|-id=839 bgcolor=#E9E9E9
| 178839 ||  || — || April 23, 2001 || Socorro || LINEAR || — || align=right | 1.7 km || 
|-id=840 bgcolor=#fefefe
| 178840 ||  || — || April 26, 2001 || Kitt Peak || Spacewatch || — || align=right | 1.6 km || 
|-id=841 bgcolor=#fefefe
| 178841 ||  || — || April 16, 2001 || Anderson Mesa || LONEOS || MAS || align=right | 1.2 km || 
|-id=842 bgcolor=#fefefe
| 178842 ||  || — || April 23, 2001 || Anderson Mesa || LONEOS || FLO || align=right | 1.1 km || 
|-id=843 bgcolor=#fefefe
| 178843 ||  || — || April 23, 2001 || Socorro || LINEAR || — || align=right | 1.3 km || 
|-id=844 bgcolor=#fefefe
| 178844 ||  || — || April 23, 2001 || Socorro || LINEAR || ERI || align=right | 3.6 km || 
|-id=845 bgcolor=#fefefe
| 178845 ||  || — || April 26, 2001 || Anderson Mesa || LONEOS || V || align=right | 1.00 km || 
|-id=846 bgcolor=#fefefe
| 178846 || 2001 JT || — || May 10, 2001 || Ondřejov || L. Kotková || — || align=right | 1.1 km || 
|-id=847 bgcolor=#fefefe
| 178847 ||  || — || May 15, 2001 || Anderson Mesa || LONEOS || — || align=right | 1.2 km || 
|-id=848 bgcolor=#fefefe
| 178848 ||  || — || May 15, 2001 || Haleakala || NEAT || MAS || align=right | 1.2 km || 
|-id=849 bgcolor=#fefefe
| 178849 ||  || — || May 15, 2001 || Anderson Mesa || LONEOS || V || align=right | 1.1 km || 
|-id=850 bgcolor=#fefefe
| 178850 ||  || — || May 15, 2001 || Haleakala || NEAT || ERI || align=right | 2.6 km || 
|-id=851 bgcolor=#fefefe
| 178851 ||  || — || May 17, 2001 || Socorro || LINEAR || — || align=right | 1.8 km || 
|-id=852 bgcolor=#fefefe
| 178852 ||  || — || May 18, 2001 || Socorro || LINEAR || NYS || align=right | 1.2 km || 
|-id=853 bgcolor=#fefefe
| 178853 ||  || — || May 18, 2001 || Socorro || LINEAR || — || align=right | 1.8 km || 
|-id=854 bgcolor=#fefefe
| 178854 ||  || — || May 18, 2001 || Socorro || LINEAR || — || align=right | 1.4 km || 
|-id=855 bgcolor=#fefefe
| 178855 ||  || — || May 21, 2001 || Kitt Peak || Spacewatch || V || align=right | 1.0 km || 
|-id=856 bgcolor=#FA8072
| 178856 ||  || — || May 22, 2001 || Socorro || LINEAR || — || align=right | 1.8 km || 
|-id=857 bgcolor=#fefefe
| 178857 ||  || — || May 18, 2001 || Haleakala || NEAT || ERI || align=right | 3.4 km || 
|-id=858 bgcolor=#fefefe
| 178858 ||  || — || May 17, 2001 || Socorro || LINEAR || — || align=right | 1.4 km || 
|-id=859 bgcolor=#fefefe
| 178859 ||  || — || May 17, 2001 || Socorro || LINEAR || — || align=right | 1.2 km || 
|-id=860 bgcolor=#fefefe
| 178860 ||  || — || May 22, 2001 || Socorro || LINEAR || — || align=right | 3.3 km || 
|-id=861 bgcolor=#fefefe
| 178861 ||  || — || May 23, 2001 || Socorro || LINEAR || — || align=right | 1.5 km || 
|-id=862 bgcolor=#E9E9E9
| 178862 ||  || — || May 18, 2001 || Anderson Mesa || LONEOS || MIT || align=right | 4.2 km || 
|-id=863 bgcolor=#fefefe
| 178863 ||  || — || May 18, 2001 || Haleakala || NEAT || SUL || align=right | 2.8 km || 
|-id=864 bgcolor=#fefefe
| 178864 ||  || — || May 21, 2001 || Anderson Mesa || LONEOS || — || align=right | 1.6 km || 
|-id=865 bgcolor=#fefefe
| 178865 ||  || — || May 23, 2001 || Socorro || LINEAR || — || align=right | 1.4 km || 
|-id=866 bgcolor=#fefefe
| 178866 ||  || — || May 26, 2001 || Socorro || LINEAR || V || align=right | 1.2 km || 
|-id=867 bgcolor=#E9E9E9
| 178867 ||  || — || June 15, 2001 || Socorro || LINEAR || — || align=right | 6.8 km || 
|-id=868 bgcolor=#E9E9E9
| 178868 ||  || — || June 17, 2001 || Palomar || NEAT || — || align=right | 1.9 km || 
|-id=869 bgcolor=#E9E9E9
| 178869 ||  || — || June 19, 2001 || Palomar || NEAT || — || align=right | 1.9 km || 
|-id=870 bgcolor=#E9E9E9
| 178870 ||  || — || June 21, 2001 || Palomar || NEAT || — || align=right | 2.7 km || 
|-id=871 bgcolor=#FFC2E0
| 178871 ||  || — || June 21, 2001 || Palomar || NEAT || AMO +1km || align=right | 1.1 km || 
|-id=872 bgcolor=#E9E9E9
| 178872 ||  || — || June 24, 2001 || Kitt Peak || Spacewatch || — || align=right | 2.4 km || 
|-id=873 bgcolor=#E9E9E9
| 178873 ||  || — || June 26, 2001 || Palomar || NEAT || EUN || align=right | 2.0 km || 
|-id=874 bgcolor=#E9E9E9
| 178874 ||  || — || June 28, 2001 || Haleakala || NEAT || — || align=right | 2.1 km || 
|-id=875 bgcolor=#E9E9E9
| 178875 ||  || — || June 27, 2001 || Haleakala || NEAT || — || align=right | 4.3 km || 
|-id=876 bgcolor=#E9E9E9
| 178876 ||  || — || July 14, 2001 || Haleakala || NEAT || — || align=right | 3.2 km || 
|-id=877 bgcolor=#E9E9E9
| 178877 ||  || — || July 12, 2001 || Palomar || NEAT || — || align=right | 2.6 km || 
|-id=878 bgcolor=#E9E9E9
| 178878 ||  || — || July 14, 2001 || Palomar || NEAT || EUN || align=right | 1.9 km || 
|-id=879 bgcolor=#fefefe
| 178879 ||  || — || July 14, 2001 || Haleakala || NEAT || — || align=right | 2.6 km || 
|-id=880 bgcolor=#E9E9E9
| 178880 ||  || — || July 14, 2001 || Haleakala || NEAT || — || align=right | 1.4 km || 
|-id=881 bgcolor=#fefefe
| 178881 || 2001 OY || — || July 17, 2001 || Haleakala || NEAT || — || align=right | 1.4 km || 
|-id=882 bgcolor=#E9E9E9
| 178882 ||  || — || July 17, 2001 || Anderson Mesa || LONEOS || EUN || align=right | 1.9 km || 
|-id=883 bgcolor=#E9E9E9
| 178883 ||  || — || July 20, 2001 || Palomar || NEAT || — || align=right | 1.9 km || 
|-id=884 bgcolor=#E9E9E9
| 178884 ||  || — || July 17, 2001 || Haleakala || NEAT || — || align=right | 1.5 km || 
|-id=885 bgcolor=#E9E9E9
| 178885 ||  || — || July 19, 2001 || Anderson Mesa || LONEOS || GEF || align=right | 2.3 km || 
|-id=886 bgcolor=#E9E9E9
| 178886 ||  || — || July 16, 2001 || Anderson Mesa || LONEOS || — || align=right | 1.8 km || 
|-id=887 bgcolor=#fefefe
| 178887 ||  || — || July 18, 2001 || Palomar || NEAT || — || align=right | 1.7 km || 
|-id=888 bgcolor=#fefefe
| 178888 ||  || — || July 19, 2001 || Palomar || NEAT || — || align=right | 1.5 km || 
|-id=889 bgcolor=#E9E9E9
| 178889 ||  || — || July 19, 2001 || Palomar || NEAT || MAR || align=right | 1.6 km || 
|-id=890 bgcolor=#E9E9E9
| 178890 ||  || — || July 20, 2001 || Palomar || NEAT || — || align=right | 3.2 km || 
|-id=891 bgcolor=#d6d6d6
| 178891 ||  || — || July 20, 2001 || Palomar || NEAT || EOS || align=right | 3.1 km || 
|-id=892 bgcolor=#fefefe
| 178892 ||  || — || July 22, 2001 || Palomar || NEAT || H || align=right data-sort-value="0.90" | 900 m || 
|-id=893 bgcolor=#d6d6d6
| 178893 ||  || — || July 22, 2001 || Palomar || NEAT || — || align=right | 3.4 km || 
|-id=894 bgcolor=#E9E9E9
| 178894 ||  || — || July 16, 2001 || Haleakala || NEAT || — || align=right | 1.4 km || 
|-id=895 bgcolor=#E9E9E9
| 178895 ||  || — || July 17, 2001 || Anderson Mesa || LONEOS || — || align=right | 2.0 km || 
|-id=896 bgcolor=#E9E9E9
| 178896 ||  || — || July 20, 2001 || Anderson Mesa || LONEOS || — || align=right | 2.6 km || 
|-id=897 bgcolor=#E9E9E9
| 178897 ||  || — || July 21, 2001 || Haleakala || NEAT || — || align=right | 4.1 km || 
|-id=898 bgcolor=#E9E9E9
| 178898 ||  || — || July 19, 2001 || Anderson Mesa || LONEOS || EUN || align=right | 2.3 km || 
|-id=899 bgcolor=#E9E9E9
| 178899 ||  || — || July 20, 2001 || Palomar || NEAT || — || align=right | 3.7 km || 
|-id=900 bgcolor=#fefefe
| 178900 ||  || — || July 29, 2001 || Palomar || NEAT || H || align=right | 1.3 km || 
|}

178901–179000 

|-bgcolor=#E9E9E9
| 178901 ||  || — || July 27, 2001 || Palomar || NEAT || — || align=right | 1.8 km || 
|-id=902 bgcolor=#E9E9E9
| 178902 ||  || — || July 23, 2001 || Haleakala || NEAT || EUN || align=right | 1.9 km || 
|-id=903 bgcolor=#E9E9E9
| 178903 ||  || — || July 25, 2001 || Haleakala || NEAT || — || align=right | 1.9 km || 
|-id=904 bgcolor=#E9E9E9
| 178904 ||  || — || July 25, 2001 || Haleakala || NEAT || — || align=right | 2.9 km || 
|-id=905 bgcolor=#E9E9E9
| 178905 ||  || — || July 26, 2001 || Palomar || NEAT || — || align=right | 1.3 km || 
|-id=906 bgcolor=#E9E9E9
| 178906 ||  || — || July 27, 2001 || Anderson Mesa || LONEOS || — || align=right | 1.8 km || 
|-id=907 bgcolor=#E9E9E9
| 178907 ||  || — || July 20, 2001 || Palomar || NEAT || MAR || align=right | 2.6 km || 
|-id=908 bgcolor=#fefefe
| 178908 ||  || — || August 5, 2001 || Haleakala || NEAT || H || align=right | 1.2 km || 
|-id=909 bgcolor=#E9E9E9
| 178909 ||  || — || August 9, 2001 || Palomar || NEAT || — || align=right | 3.8 km || 
|-id=910 bgcolor=#E9E9E9
| 178910 ||  || — || August 10, 2001 || Haleakala || NEAT || — || align=right | 2.4 km || 
|-id=911 bgcolor=#E9E9E9
| 178911 ||  || — || August 11, 2001 || Haleakala || NEAT || — || align=right | 1.6 km || 
|-id=912 bgcolor=#E9E9E9
| 178912 ||  || — || August 11, 2001 || Haleakala || NEAT || — || align=right | 1.6 km || 
|-id=913 bgcolor=#fefefe
| 178913 ||  || — || August 10, 2001 || Palomar || NEAT || — || align=right | 2.1 km || 
|-id=914 bgcolor=#E9E9E9
| 178914 ||  || — || August 11, 2001 || Palomar || NEAT || — || align=right | 3.6 km || 
|-id=915 bgcolor=#E9E9E9
| 178915 ||  || — || August 13, 2001 || Haleakala || NEAT || — || align=right | 2.9 km || 
|-id=916 bgcolor=#E9E9E9
| 178916 ||  || — || August 16, 2001 || Socorro || LINEAR || — || align=right | 3.4 km || 
|-id=917 bgcolor=#E9E9E9
| 178917 ||  || — || August 16, 2001 || Socorro || LINEAR || — || align=right | 1.9 km || 
|-id=918 bgcolor=#E9E9E9
| 178918 ||  || — || August 16, 2001 || Socorro || LINEAR || MAR || align=right | 2.0 km || 
|-id=919 bgcolor=#E9E9E9
| 178919 ||  || — || August 16, 2001 || Socorro || LINEAR || — || align=right | 1.7 km || 
|-id=920 bgcolor=#E9E9E9
| 178920 ||  || — || August 16, 2001 || Socorro || LINEAR || — || align=right | 2.8 km || 
|-id=921 bgcolor=#E9E9E9
| 178921 ||  || — || August 16, 2001 || Socorro || LINEAR || ADE || align=right | 4.5 km || 
|-id=922 bgcolor=#E9E9E9
| 178922 ||  || — || August 16, 2001 || Socorro || LINEAR || — || align=right | 3.9 km || 
|-id=923 bgcolor=#fefefe
| 178923 ||  || — || August 16, 2001 || Socorro || LINEAR || H || align=right data-sort-value="0.95" | 950 m || 
|-id=924 bgcolor=#E9E9E9
| 178924 ||  || — || August 16, 2001 || Socorro || LINEAR || — || align=right | 1.9 km || 
|-id=925 bgcolor=#d6d6d6
| 178925 ||  || — || August 16, 2001 || Socorro || LINEAR || — || align=right | 4.4 km || 
|-id=926 bgcolor=#fefefe
| 178926 ||  || — || August 16, 2001 || Socorro || LINEAR || H || align=right data-sort-value="0.94" | 940 m || 
|-id=927 bgcolor=#E9E9E9
| 178927 ||  || — || August 16, 2001 || Socorro || LINEAR || — || align=right | 1.6 km || 
|-id=928 bgcolor=#fefefe
| 178928 ||  || — || August 16, 2001 || Socorro || LINEAR || — || align=right | 1.2 km || 
|-id=929 bgcolor=#E9E9E9
| 178929 ||  || — || August 16, 2001 || Socorro || LINEAR || — || align=right | 2.3 km || 
|-id=930 bgcolor=#E9E9E9
| 178930 ||  || — || August 16, 2001 || Socorro || LINEAR || — || align=right | 2.5 km || 
|-id=931 bgcolor=#fefefe
| 178931 ||  || — || August 16, 2001 || Socorro || LINEAR || — || align=right | 1.3 km || 
|-id=932 bgcolor=#E9E9E9
| 178932 ||  || — || August 17, 2001 || Socorro || LINEAR || NEM || align=right | 2.3 km || 
|-id=933 bgcolor=#E9E9E9
| 178933 ||  || — || August 17, 2001 || Socorro || LINEAR || — || align=right | 1.9 km || 
|-id=934 bgcolor=#E9E9E9
| 178934 ||  || — || August 19, 2001 || Socorro || LINEAR || — || align=right | 1.5 km || 
|-id=935 bgcolor=#E9E9E9
| 178935 ||  || — || August 17, 2001 || Socorro || LINEAR || ADE || align=right | 3.4 km || 
|-id=936 bgcolor=#E9E9E9
| 178936 ||  || — || August 17, 2001 || Socorro || LINEAR || — || align=right | 3.6 km || 
|-id=937 bgcolor=#E9E9E9
| 178937 ||  || — || August 17, 2001 || Socorro || LINEAR || — || align=right | 3.4 km || 
|-id=938 bgcolor=#E9E9E9
| 178938 ||  || — || August 22, 2001 || Desert Eagle || W. K. Y. Yeung || — || align=right | 1.6 km || 
|-id=939 bgcolor=#E9E9E9
| 178939 ||  || — || August 16, 2001 || Palomar || NEAT || — || align=right | 4.9 km || 
|-id=940 bgcolor=#E9E9E9
| 178940 ||  || — || August 19, 2001 || Socorro || LINEAR || — || align=right | 1.9 km || 
|-id=941 bgcolor=#FA8072
| 178941 ||  || — || August 19, 2001 || Haleakala || NEAT || H || align=right | 1.3 km || 
|-id=942 bgcolor=#fefefe
| 178942 ||  || — || August 19, 2001 || Socorro || LINEAR || — || align=right | 1.3 km || 
|-id=943 bgcolor=#E9E9E9
| 178943 ||  || — || August 25, 2001 || Pla D'Arguines || R. Ferrando || — || align=right | 4.1 km || 
|-id=944 bgcolor=#E9E9E9
| 178944 ||  || — || August 19, 2001 || Socorro || LINEAR || — || align=right | 1.9 km || 
|-id=945 bgcolor=#fefefe
| 178945 ||  || — || August 19, 2001 || Socorro || LINEAR || NYS || align=right | 1.0 km || 
|-id=946 bgcolor=#E9E9E9
| 178946 ||  || — || August 19, 2001 || Socorro || LINEAR || — || align=right | 1.8 km || 
|-id=947 bgcolor=#E9E9E9
| 178947 ||  || — || August 19, 2001 || Socorro || LINEAR || RAF || align=right | 1.5 km || 
|-id=948 bgcolor=#E9E9E9
| 178948 ||  || — || August 20, 2001 || Socorro || LINEAR || — || align=right | 1.6 km || 
|-id=949 bgcolor=#E9E9E9
| 178949 ||  || — || August 20, 2001 || Socorro || LINEAR || — || align=right | 1.9 km || 
|-id=950 bgcolor=#E9E9E9
| 178950 ||  || — || August 22, 2001 || Socorro || LINEAR || BRU || align=right | 4.7 km || 
|-id=951 bgcolor=#E9E9E9
| 178951 ||  || — || August 22, 2001 || Haleakala || NEAT || — || align=right | 2.9 km || 
|-id=952 bgcolor=#fefefe
| 178952 ||  || — || August 24, 2001 || Socorro || LINEAR || — || align=right | 3.7 km || 
|-id=953 bgcolor=#E9E9E9
| 178953 ||  || — || August 31, 2001 || Palomar || NEAT || WIT || align=right | 2.0 km || 
|-id=954 bgcolor=#E9E9E9
| 178954 ||  || — || August 24, 2001 || Haleakala || NEAT || — || align=right | 4.2 km || 
|-id=955 bgcolor=#E9E9E9
| 178955 ||  || — || August 25, 2001 || Palomar || NEAT || ADE || align=right | 5.1 km || 
|-id=956 bgcolor=#E9E9E9
| 178956 ||  || — || August 21, 2001 || Kitt Peak || Spacewatch || — || align=right | 2.0 km || 
|-id=957 bgcolor=#fefefe
| 178957 ||  || — || August 21, 2001 || Palomar || NEAT || H || align=right | 1.1 km || 
|-id=958 bgcolor=#d6d6d6
| 178958 ||  || — || August 21, 2001 || Haleakala || NEAT || — || align=right | 8.1 km || 
|-id=959 bgcolor=#E9E9E9
| 178959 ||  || — || August 22, 2001 || Kitt Peak || Spacewatch || — || align=right | 1.8 km || 
|-id=960 bgcolor=#E9E9E9
| 178960 ||  || — || August 22, 2001 || Socorro || LINEAR || — || align=right | 2.8 km || 
|-id=961 bgcolor=#E9E9E9
| 178961 ||  || — || August 23, 2001 || Anderson Mesa || LONEOS || WIT || align=right | 4.2 km || 
|-id=962 bgcolor=#E9E9E9
| 178962 ||  || — || August 23, 2001 || Anderson Mesa || LONEOS || — || align=right | 2.9 km || 
|-id=963 bgcolor=#E9E9E9
| 178963 ||  || — || August 23, 2001 || Anderson Mesa || LONEOS || — || align=right | 1.3 km || 
|-id=964 bgcolor=#E9E9E9
| 178964 ||  || — || August 23, 2001 || Anderson Mesa || LONEOS || — || align=right | 3.2 km || 
|-id=965 bgcolor=#E9E9E9
| 178965 ||  || — || August 23, 2001 || Anderson Mesa || LONEOS || RAF || align=right | 1.4 km || 
|-id=966 bgcolor=#E9E9E9
| 178966 ||  || — || August 24, 2001 || Anderson Mesa || LONEOS || — || align=right | 3.5 km || 
|-id=967 bgcolor=#E9E9E9
| 178967 ||  || — || August 24, 2001 || Anderson Mesa || LONEOS || — || align=right | 2.5 km || 
|-id=968 bgcolor=#E9E9E9
| 178968 ||  || — || August 24, 2001 || Anderson Mesa || LONEOS || — || align=right | 3.4 km || 
|-id=969 bgcolor=#E9E9E9
| 178969 ||  || — || August 24, 2001 || Anderson Mesa || LONEOS || — || align=right | 4.1 km || 
|-id=970 bgcolor=#d6d6d6
| 178970 ||  || — || August 24, 2001 || Desert Eagle || W. K. Y. Yeung || MEL || align=right | 5.5 km || 
|-id=971 bgcolor=#fefefe
| 178971 ||  || — || August 24, 2001 || Socorro || LINEAR || — || align=right | 1.7 km || 
|-id=972 bgcolor=#E9E9E9
| 178972 ||  || — || August 24, 2001 || Socorro || LINEAR || INO || align=right | 1.5 km || 
|-id=973 bgcolor=#E9E9E9
| 178973 ||  || — || August 24, 2001 || Socorro || LINEAR || — || align=right | 2.4 km || 
|-id=974 bgcolor=#E9E9E9
| 178974 ||  || — || August 24, 2001 || Socorro || LINEAR || — || align=right | 3.3 km || 
|-id=975 bgcolor=#E9E9E9
| 178975 ||  || — || August 24, 2001 || Socorro || LINEAR || — || align=right | 1.8 km || 
|-id=976 bgcolor=#E9E9E9
| 178976 ||  || — || August 24, 2001 || Socorro || LINEAR || — || align=right | 2.2 km || 
|-id=977 bgcolor=#E9E9E9
| 178977 ||  || — || August 25, 2001 || Anderson Mesa || LONEOS || CLO || align=right | 3.0 km || 
|-id=978 bgcolor=#E9E9E9
| 178978 ||  || — || August 25, 2001 || Socorro || LINEAR || — || align=right | 2.3 km || 
|-id=979 bgcolor=#fefefe
| 178979 ||  || — || August 25, 2001 || Socorro || LINEAR || H || align=right data-sort-value="0.95" | 950 m || 
|-id=980 bgcolor=#E9E9E9
| 178980 ||  || — || August 25, 2001 || Desert Eagle || W. K. Y. Yeung || — || align=right | 3.1 km || 
|-id=981 bgcolor=#E9E9E9
| 178981 ||  || — || August 20, 2001 || Socorro || LINEAR || — || align=right | 2.6 km || 
|-id=982 bgcolor=#E9E9E9
| 178982 ||  || — || August 20, 2001 || Socorro || LINEAR || — || align=right | 3.0 km || 
|-id=983 bgcolor=#E9E9E9
| 178983 ||  || — || August 19, 2001 || Socorro || LINEAR || — || align=right | 1.9 km || 
|-id=984 bgcolor=#E9E9E9
| 178984 ||  || — || August 19, 2001 || Socorro || LINEAR || — || align=right | 1.9 km || 
|-id=985 bgcolor=#fefefe
| 178985 ||  || — || August 17, 2001 || Socorro || LINEAR || H || align=right | 1.2 km || 
|-id=986 bgcolor=#E9E9E9
| 178986 ||  || — || August 16, 2001 || Palomar || NEAT || EUN || align=right | 2.2 km || 
|-id=987 bgcolor=#E9E9E9
| 178987 Jillianredfern ||  ||  || August 19, 2001 || Cerro Tololo || M. W. Buie || — || align=right | 1.9 km || 
|-id=988 bgcolor=#E9E9E9
| 178988 ||  || — || August 19, 2001 || Cerro Tololo || Cerro Tololo Obs. || AGN || align=right | 1.5 km || 
|-id=989 bgcolor=#E9E9E9
| 178989 ||  || — || August 25, 2001 || Socorro || LINEAR || — || align=right | 3.8 km || 
|-id=990 bgcolor=#E9E9E9
| 178990 ||  || — || August 25, 2001 || Anderson Mesa || LONEOS || INO || align=right | 2.0 km || 
|-id=991 bgcolor=#E9E9E9
| 178991 ||  || — || August 22, 2001 || Socorro || LINEAR || — || align=right | 4.5 km || 
|-id=992 bgcolor=#E9E9E9
| 178992 ||  || — || September 9, 2001 || Eskridge || G. Hug || — || align=right | 1.3 km || 
|-id=993 bgcolor=#E9E9E9
| 178993 ||  || — || September 9, 2001 || Goodricke-Pigott || R. A. Tucker || — || align=right | 3.7 km || 
|-id=994 bgcolor=#E9E9E9
| 178994 ||  || — || September 9, 2001 || Desert Eagle || W. K. Y. Yeung || — || align=right | 1.6 km || 
|-id=995 bgcolor=#E9E9E9
| 178995 ||  || — || September 8, 2001 || Socorro || LINEAR || — || align=right | 1.7 km || 
|-id=996 bgcolor=#fefefe
| 178996 ||  || — || September 8, 2001 || Socorro || LINEAR || H || align=right data-sort-value="0.84" | 840 m || 
|-id=997 bgcolor=#fefefe
| 178997 ||  || — || September 10, 2001 || Socorro || LINEAR || H || align=right | 1.4 km || 
|-id=998 bgcolor=#fefefe
| 178998 ||  || — || September 10, 2001 || Socorro || LINEAR || H || align=right | 1.3 km || 
|-id=999 bgcolor=#E9E9E9
| 178999 ||  || — || September 10, 2001 || Goodricke-Pigott || R. A. Tucker || JNS || align=right | 4.3 km || 
|-id=000 bgcolor=#E9E9E9
| 179000 ||  || — || September 10, 2001 || Socorro || LINEAR || PAD || align=right | 4.1 km || 
|}

References

External links 
 Discovery Circumstances: Numbered Minor Planets (175001)–(180000) (IAU Minor Planet Center)

0178